= Port Tobacco Village, Maryland =

- Town
- Coordinates: 38°30′41″N 77°1′12″W
- Country: United States
- State: Maryland
- County: Charles
- Settled: 1634
- Incorporated: 1888

Area
  - Total: 0.19 sq mi (0.48 km^{2})
  - Land: 0.19 sq mi (0.48 km^{2})
  - Water: 0 sq mi (0.00 km^{2})
- Elevation: 100 ft (30 m)

Population (2020)
  - Total: 18
  - Density: 97.6/sq mi (37.68/km^{2})
- Time zone: UTC-5 (Eastern (EST))
  - Summer (DST): UTC-4 (EDT)
- ZIP code: 20677
- Area codes: 240 and 301
- FIPS code: 24-63225

Port Tobacco, officially Port Tobacco Village, is a town in Charles County, Maryland, United States. As of the 2020 census, Port Tobacco Village had a population of 18, making it the smallest incorporated town in Maryland.

== Overview ==
This was historically the territory of Algonquian-speaking peoples, especially the Potapoco and the more dominant Piscataway. Settled by the English in the 17th century and established in 1727, the town on the Port Tobacco River soon became the second largest in Maryland. The first county seat of Charles County, it was a seaport with access to the Chesapeake Bay and Atlantic Ocean. It declined rapidly after river traffic was cut off by silting and the town was bypassed by the railroad. The town incorporated in 1888, but in 1895 the county seat moved to nearby La Plata, which drew population away but left the town with its historic significance intact.

Since the late 20th century, the former 1819 courthouse has been renovated for use as a historical museum. In 2007 a consortium started the Port Tobacco Archeology Project, devoted to revealing the history of Native Americans and colonial Europeans and Africans. Because of its unique history, the area is "one of the richest archeological sites in Southern Maryland."

A few miles south, the St. Ignatius Church, manor house, and cemetery at St. Thomas Manor comprise a complex designated as a National Historic Landmark. It is notable as a Jesuit mission center established in the 17th century and is likely the oldest continuously operating Roman Catholic parish founded in the Thirteen Colonies. The complex at Chapel Point has scenic views overlooking the Potomac River. John Hanson, President of the U.S. Continental Congress, was born nearby.

=== History ===
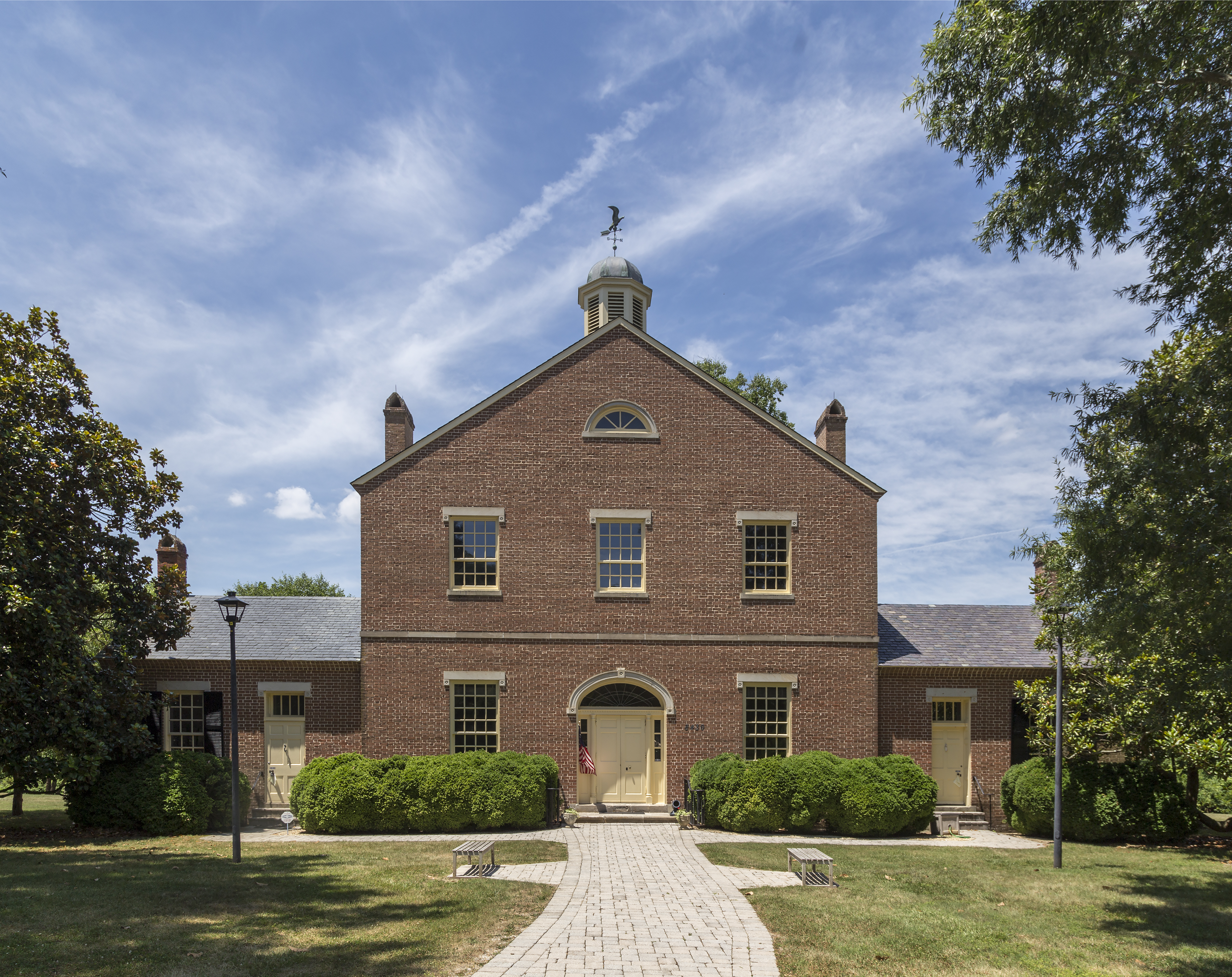
Modern recreation of the 1819 Charles County courthouse in Port Tobacco Village

Areas along the waterways of present-day Maryland were inhabited for thousands of years by various cultures of distinct indigenous peoples. At the time of European exploration, this coastal area along the Port Tobacco River was the territory of the Potapoco, an Algonquian-speaking tribe. They called their settlement Potapoco. Overall, the dominant tribe on the north side of the Potomac River was the Algonquian Piscataway tribe, which later absorbed some of the smaller tribes' survivors.

=== Colonial era ===
Within a generation of the first Maryland settlers' landing at St. Clement's Island, they pushed the frontiers of the colony north and west toward the Potomac and Port Tobacco rivers. The English developed a small village about 1634 on the east side of the Port Tobacco tributary. It became the nucleus for trade and government. It was first called Chandlers Town. The town was one of the oldest English-speaking communities on the East Coast of the United States. In 1658, it was designated the first county seat of Charles County.

==== Tobacco, merchants and slave trade ====
Later the English adapted the Potapoco name as Port Tobacco. Its name also referred to what became the colony's chief export commodity crop. The town grew as it became a major port for the tobacco trade, with exports transported by ocean-going sailing ships.

During the late 17th century, Port Tobacco became the second-largest river port in Maryland. In the 1760s, Port Tobacco shipped a million pounds of tobacco each year. Tobacco factor Robert Fergusson, who worked for John Glassford & Company, lived just outside Port Tobacco at "Mulberry Grove" with ten enslaved people.

Merchants operated stores from their homes. Stagg Hall was built for merchant John Parnham about 1740. Mercantile firm Barnes and Ridgate operated in Chimney House, and traded primarily in tobacco. However, in summer 1770, they also offered enslaved persons for sale who had arrived on the ships Providence and Peggy.

Other merchants included Richard Harrison & Company and, later, William Boswell & Company.

==== Church of England and English Catholic immigrants ====
The early immigrants to Port Tobacco were products of the religious turmoil in England. Their deeply felt convictions were powerful influences in Maryland's history. The area had both English Catholic and Church of England congregations. Father Andrew White of the Jesuits established a mission in 1641 and later a church at what became St. Thomas Manor at Chapel Point. The manor's chapel was expanded to what is called St. Ignatius Church, a center for local Native Americans converted to Christianity. The oldest continuously operating Catholic parish in the United States, the complex has been designated as a National Historic Landmark and is part of the Religious Freedom Maryland Scenic Byways route. Catholic parish records identified Indian families through the decades, when civil records began to use only designations of free people of color, colored, or Negro for mixed-race persons, thus failing to record their cultural identification. The two state-recognized Piscataway-descendant tribes have used Catholic records in making their case for cultural continuity.

Freed from restraints by the Toleration Act of 1649 and feeling a need for spiritual guidance, some settlers gathered their first Anglican congregation in a log building at the head of the Port Tobacco Creek in 1683, nine years before the Establishment Act. Supported by the tobacco poll tax of 40 pounds per head from 1692 to 1776, Christ Church prospered. The community built a second structure in 1709. After the American Revolution, although the Anglican Church was disestablished in the US, parishioners rallied to contribute directly to Christ Church, and Lemuel Wilmer, of a distinguished family of Maryland Episcopalian clerics which included his brother William Holland Wilmer, uncle James Jones Wilmer, and father, grandfather and brother (all named Simon Wilmer) served as rector for 35 years. After a tornado destroyed the building in 1808, they held a lottery and ultimately financed a new brick structure, which was rededicated in 1827. Falling into disrepair after 60 years of use, it was demolished and replaced with a sandstone edifice in 1884. However, only the graveyard now remains of this church (and a relatively recently outline of the historic church's foundation), since it was disassembled in 1904 and reassembled in La Plata, which had become the county seat in 1895.

==== Prominent early residents ====
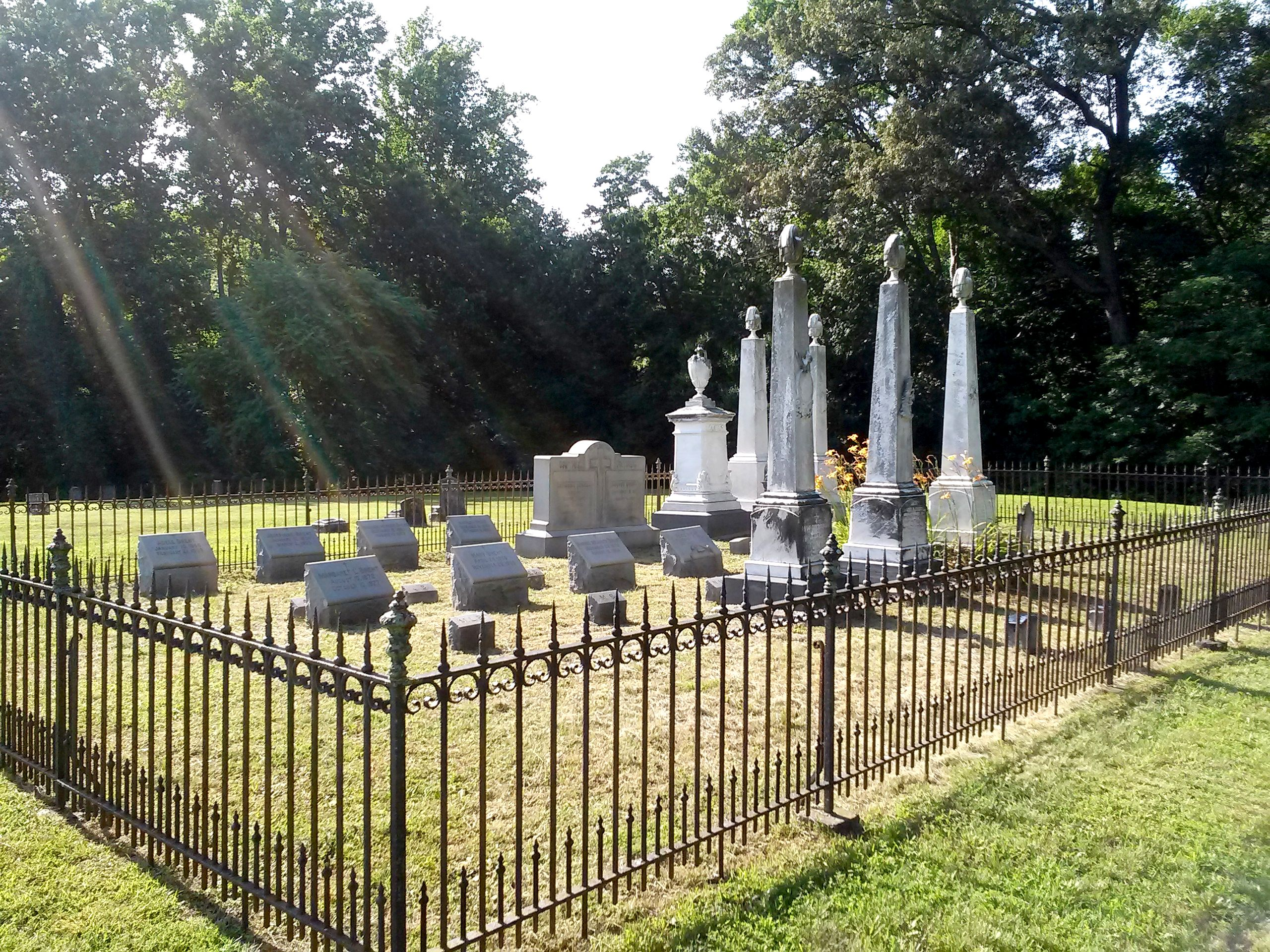
Graveyard next to outline of historic Christ Church in Port Tobacco (building moved to La Plata)

For two centuries, Port Tobacco area residents assumed important roles in state and national history. John Hanson was elected first President by the Continental Congress under the Articles of Confederation before moving to Frederick. Daniel of St. Thomas Jenifer was a signer of the United States Constitution; and Thomas Stone was one of four of the Maryland delegation who signed the Declaration of Independence.

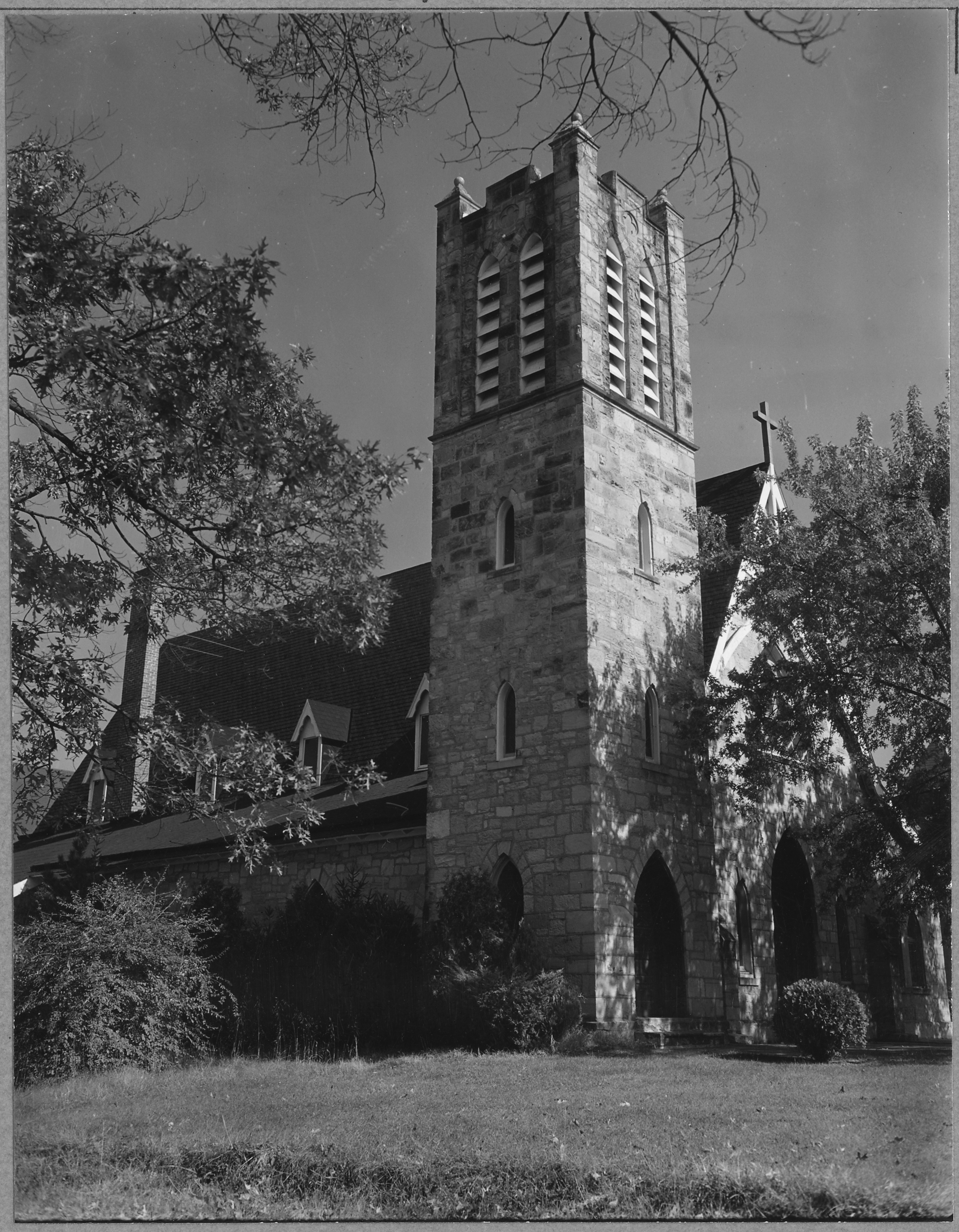
The Episcopal Church moved from Port Tobacco to the new county seat at La Plata.

=== Civil War ===
During the Civil War, Port Tobacco became known as a stronghold of Confederate sympathizers, although Union troops occupied the town. Rose O'Neal Greenhow (1814–1864), born here, became renowned as a Confederate spy operating in Washington, DC. Recruited by former US Army captain Thomas Jordan, later promoted to Confederate general, she took over his network in early 1861. Due to military plans she passed to the Confederates that summer, she was credited with ensuring their victory at the First Battle of Bull Run in July 1861. Local slaves were freed following Maryland's adoption of a new Constitution on November 1, 1864 (the Emancipation Proclamation of 1863 did not apply to states which remained in the Union). During the hunt for John Wilkes Booth after the assassination of President Abraham Lincoln, intelligence gathered in a Port Tobacco hotel (Brawner Hotel) (conspirator George Atzerodt lived in town) established the assassin had fled with his companion Herold into Virginia, where they were ultimately located and Herold surrendered, but Booth died during the attempted capture.

=== Decline ===
Port Tobacco started declining as erosion from excessive agricultural use and poor soil conservation caused significant siltation at the head of the Port Tobacco River, decreasing its navigability and ultimately cutting off the town from access to Chesapeake Bay and the Atlantic Ocean. Larger merchant vessels were unable to use the former seaport; as a result, commercial activity at the port had dwindled by the time of the Civil War.

The decline was exacerbated by the completion in 1873 of a nearby Baltimore and Potomac Railroad line to Pope's Creek which bypassed Port Tobacco and ran further south to another port directly on the Potomac River. A small portion of the town's square incorporated in 1888 as Port Tobacco Village, a move that may have signaled an effort by the community to reverse its decline, but new communities eventually sprang up along the railway and prospered, including the town of La Plata which succeeded Port Tobacco as the county seat in 1895.

== Reconstruction ==
The remains today are identified as Port Tobacco Village. Because of the town's abrupt decline and silting of the river, many archaeological sites were preserved, making it one of the richest areas for studying the mixed history of Native and colonial cultures, including that of enslaved Africans. In 2007 the Port Tobacco Archeological Project began as a partnership among the Archaeological Society of Maryland, the Society for the Restoration of Port Tobacco, the Southern Maryland Heritage Area Consortium, Preservation Maryland, and Preserve America. It has encouraged participation by the community, with an Internet blog and regular chances for volunteer participation at many levels.

Visitors may see the reconstructed Port Tobacco Courthouse, furnished as it may have appeared in the 19th century, even as of the day of Booth's escape. The North wing has exhibits on tobacco culture, as well as archaeological finds which reveal early colonial and Native American life.

Other notable nearby historic sites include:

- Several 18th-century homes on the National Register of Historic Places, including Rose Hill, Ellerslie, Linden, Retreat, Stagg Hall, and Catslide House.
- The restored one-room schoolhouse, used from 1876 to 1953
- Thomas Stone National Historic Site, the plantation home of one of the 56 signers of the Declaration of Independence.
- St. Thomas Manor and Cemetery at Chapel Point is the oldest continuously operating Catholic parish among the Thirteen Colonies; exhibits provide insight into early Catholic history and Jesuit missionary activity in the colony, as well as Native American history.
- Mulberry Grove, birthplace of John Hanson

== Port Tobacco folklore ==
=== Legend of the Blue Dog ===
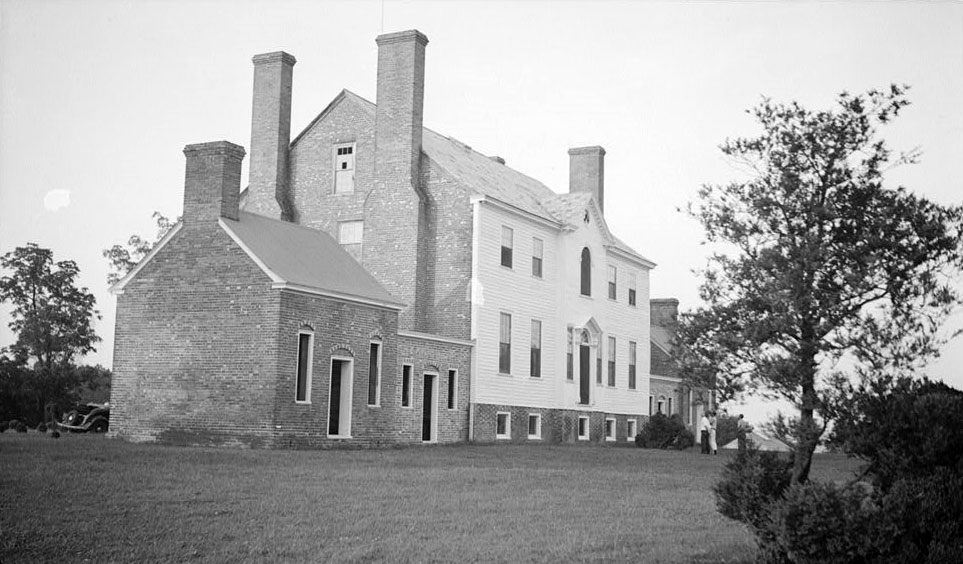
South elevation of Dr. Gustavus Brown's Rose Hill on Rose Hill Road, vicinity of Port Tobacco. Built late 18th century, restored 1937 and 1970s. Photograph by Thomas T. Waterman, 1937, for the Historic American Buildings Survey

Halloween reminds local residents of Charles County's "Blue Dog" legend, which is taught in local schools and has been told in the county for more than 100 years. By most accounts, the spirit of a large blue dog protects the treasure of his murdered master, which is supposed to be buried somewhere along Rose Hill Road outside Port Tobacco.

Charles Stuart was the owner of the Rose Hill property containing the fabled rock where Blue Dog and his master were killed. He has said that the first written account of the Blue Dog legend dates back to 1897, when Olivia Floyd, a noted Confederate spy and owner of Rose Hill, told the Port Tobacco Times that she had seen the ghost of the Blue Dog.

The legend says that Charles Thomas Sims, a soldier, and his dog were killed on February 8 in the 18th century on Rose Hill Road while returning from a Port Tobacco tavern. This was following the American Revolutionary War. Henry Hanos of Port Tobacco purportedly killed Sims and his dog for Sims' gold and a deed to an estate. Hanos buried the gold and deed under a holly tree along Rose Hill Road. When Hanos returned to recover the treasure, he was scared away by the ghost of Blue Dog. Hanos fell ill and died suddenly. To this day, Blue Dog reportedly continues to watch over his slain master's treasure.

Thuc Doan Nguyen is developing a film based on this tale.

== Transportation ==
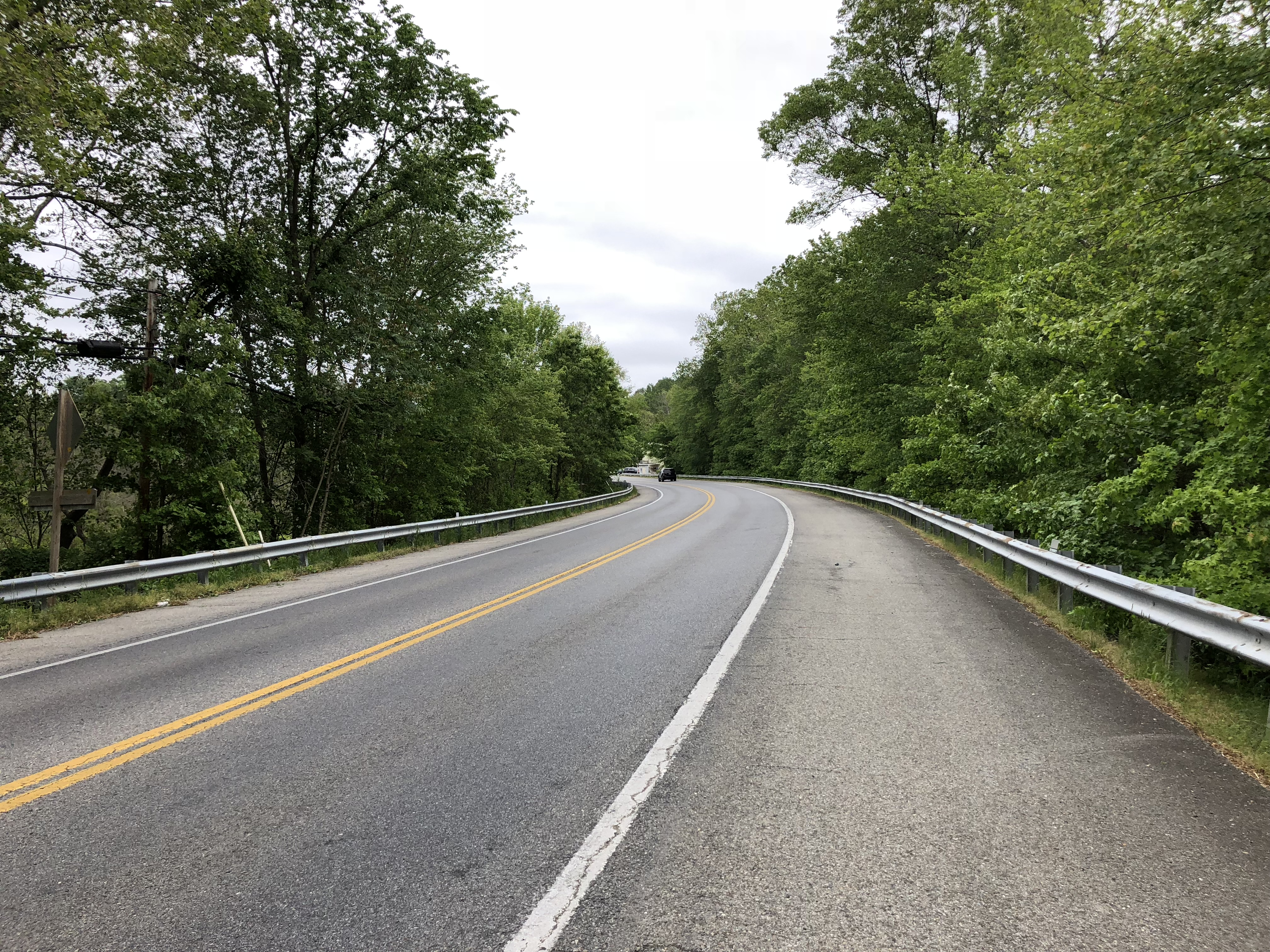
MD 6 eastbound at Causeway Street in Port Tobacco

The only state highway serving Port Tobacco is Maryland Route 6. MD 6 connects westward to Nanjemoy, while to the east, it links with US 301 in La Plata.

== Geography ==
Port Tobacco Village is located in central Charles County near the intersection of Maryland Route 6 and Chapel Point Road, just southwest of the neighboring town of La Plata. It sits near the Port Tobacco River, which joins the Potomac River a short distance south.

According to the United States Census Bureau, the town has a total area of 0.16 square miles (0.41 km^{2}), all land.

== Demographics ==
Historical population
Census	Pop.	Note	%±
1870	215		—
1880	202		−6.0%
1890	132		−34.7%
1980	40		—
1990	36		−10.0%
2000	15		−58.3%
2010	13		−13.3%
2020	18		38.5%
U.S. Decennial Census

=== 2020 census ===
Port Tobacco Village, Maryland – Racial and ethnic composition Note: the US Census treats Hispanic/Latino as an ethnic category. This table excludes Latinos from the racial categories and assigns them to a separate category. Hispanics/Latinos may be of any race.
Race / Ethnicity (NH = Non-Hispanic)	Pop 2000	Pop 2010	Pop 2020	% 2000	% 2010	% 2020
White alone (NH)	9	11	13	60.00%	84.62%	72.22%
Black or African American alone (NH)	4	1	1	26.67%	7.69%	5.56%
Native American or Alaska Native alone (NH)	0	0	0	0.00%	0.00%	0.00%
Asian alone (NH)	1	0	0	6.67%	0.00%	0.00%
Pacific Islander alone (NH)	0	0	0	0.00%	0.00%	0.00%
Some Other Race alone (NH)	0	0	0	0.00%	0.00%	0.00%
Mixed Race or Multi-Racial (NH)	1	1	2	6.67%	7.69%	11.11%
Hispanic or Latino (any race)	0	0	2	0.00%	0.00%	11.11%
Total	15	13	18	100.00%	100.00%	100.00%

=== 2010 census ===
As of the census of 2010, there were 13 people, 7 households, and 5 families residing in the town. The population density was 81.3 inhabitants per square mile (31.4/km^{2}). There were 7 housing units at an average density of 43.8 units per square mile (16.9 units/km^{2}). The racial makeup of the town was 84.6% White, 7.7% African American, and 7.7% from two or more races (each 7.7% of people included one person).

There were 7 households, of which 14.3% had children under the age of 18 living with them, 71.4% were married couples living together, and 28.6% were non-families. 28.6% of all households were made up of individuals, and 14.3% had someone living alone who was 65 years of age or older. The average household size was 1.86 and the average family size was 2.20.

The median age in the town was 64.5 years. 7.7% of residents were under the age of 18; 15.4% were between the ages of 18 and 24; 0.0% were from 25 to 44; 30.8% were from 45 to 64; and 46.2% were 65 years of age or older. The gender makeup of the town was 46.2% male and 53.8% female.

=== 2000 census ===
As of the census of 2000, there were 15 people, 5 households, and 5 families residing in the town. The population density was 94.0 inhabitants per square mile (36.3/km^{2}). There were 6 housing units at an average density of 37.6 units per square mile (14.5 units/km^{2}). The racial makeup of the town was 60.00% White, 26.67% Black or African American, 6.67% Asian, and 6.67% from two or more races.

There were 5 households, out of which 40.0% had children under the age of 18 living with them, 40.0% were married couples living together, 60.0% had a female householder with no husband present. The average household size was 3.00 and the average family size was 2.80.

In the town, the population was spread out, with 20.0% under the age of 18, 13.3% from 18 to 24, 26.7% from 25 to 44, 20.0% from 45 to 64, and 20.0% who were 65 years of age or older. The median age was 34 years. For every 100 females, there were 87.5 males. For every 100 females age 18 and over, there were 71.4 males.

The median income for a household in the town was $100,992, and the median income for a family was $102,264. The per capita income for the town was $43,017. There were no families below the poverty line.

== Notable people ==
- George Atzerodt, co-conspirator with John Wilkes Booth
- Gustavus Richard Brown (1747–1804), Edinburgh-educated physician, attended George Washington at his deathbed
- Barnes Compton (1830–1889), planter, state legislator, State Treasurer, and U.S. congressman
- John Hanson (1721–1783) first President of the Continental Congress
- Josiah Henson (1789–1883), author, abolitionist, minister, former slave, and an inspiration for Uncle Tom's Cabin
- Timmy Hill (1993–), NASCAR driver
- Tyler Hill (1994–), NASCAR driver
- Ann Teresa Mathews (1732–1800), founder of the first Catholic convent in the United States
- William Matthews (1770–1854), early American Roman Catholic priest
- Thuc Doan Nguyen (1976-), writer
- Daniel of St. Thomas Jenifer (1723–1790), a signer of the United States Constitution
- Charles H. Stonestreet (1813–1885), Jesuit leader and president of Georgetown University
