= Michael Jenifer Stone =

American politician (1747–1812)

Member of the U.S. House of Representatives from Maryland's 1st district
- In office 1789–1791
- Preceded by: Constituency established
- Succeeded by: Philip Key

Personal details
- Born: 1747 Charles County, Maryland, U.S.
- Died: 1812 (aged 64–65)
- Relations: Thomas Stone (brother); John Hoskins Stone (brother); Daniel of St. Thomas Jenifer (uncle); Frederick Stone (grandson)
- Children: 5

Michael Jenifer Stone (1747 – 1812) was an American planter and statesman from Charles County, Maryland. He represented Maryland in the United States House of Representatives.

== Early life and education ==
Stone was born to David and Elizabeth (Jenifer) Stone at Poynton Manor in Charles County. That home had been founded by his ancestor William Stone who had been the third Governor of the colony of Maryland in the mid-seventeenth century. His elder brother Thomas Stone signed the Declaration of Independence, and his younger brother John Hoskins Stone was the ninth governor of Maryland.

== Career ==
As an adult, Michael lived at Haberdeventure, which was the plantation of his brother Thomas near Port Tobacco. Michael married Mary Briscoe and they had five children. Their grandson, Frederick Stone, represented Maryland in the U.S. Congress. When Thomas died in 1787, his will gave Michael the lifetime use of Haberdeventure, and asked that he raise his young son.

Stone represented Charles County in the Maryland House of Delegates from 1781 to 1783. In 1788, he was a delegate to the states convention that ratified the U.S. Constitution. In the new Federal government, Stone represented Maryland's 1st congressional district in the First United States Congress from 1789 to 1791.

Coat of Arms of Michael J. Stone

== Personal life ==
Stone died in 1812 and was buried on his own estate of Equality near La Plata in Charles County. His son, Michael Jenifer Stone (II), built the historic home Sunnyside at Aquasco, in Prince George's County, Maryland.

U.S. House of Representatives
Preceded by None	Member of the U.S. House of Representatives from Maryland's 1st congressional district 1789 – 1791	Succeeded by Philip Key
