= Frederick Stone =

American judge

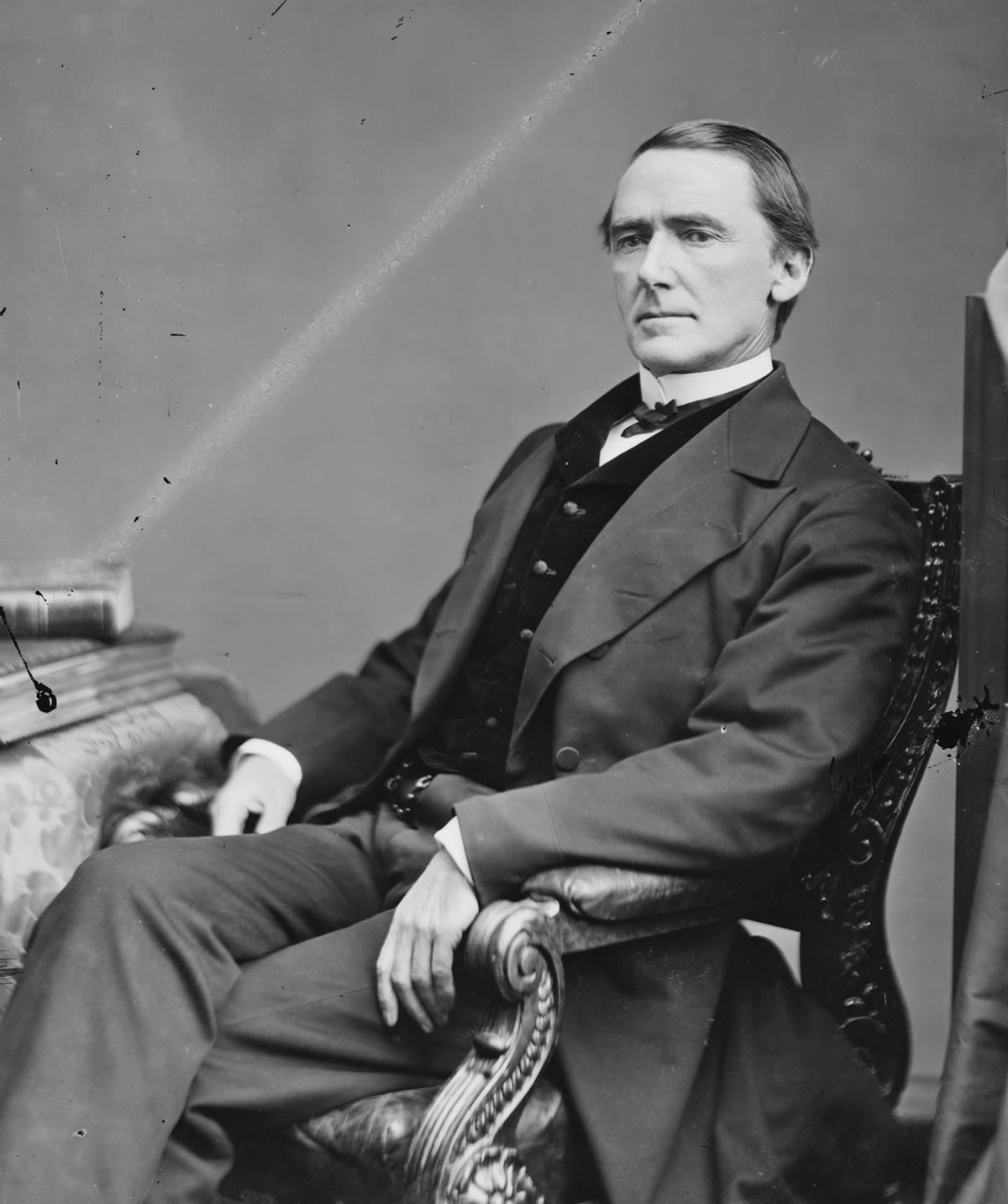
Frederick Stone

Frederick Stone (February 7, 1820 – October 17, 1899) was a lawyer who served two terms as a U.S. Congressman from the fifth district of Maryland from 1867 to 1871.

== Education and career ==
Stone was born in Leonardtown, Maryland, and graduated from St. John's College of Annapolis, Maryland in 1839. He studied law, and was admitted to the bar in 1841, beginning practice in Port Tobacco, Maryland. He was appointed by the legislature in 1852 as one of the commissioners to revise the rules of pleading and practice in the State courts.

Stone was the grandson of Michael J. Stone, the younger brother of Thomas Stone, a signer of the Declaration of Independence. During the Abraham Lincoln assassination trial in May & June 1865, Frederick Stone and Thomas Ewing Jr. appeared as defense counsels for Samuel Mudd and David Herold. Their defense is generally credited with helping Mudd avoid the death penalty.

Stone was a member of the Maryland House of Delegates in 1864 and 1865, and was elected as a Democrat to the Fortieth and Forty-first Congresses (serving March 4, 1867 – March 3, 1871). He was a member of the Constitutional convention of 1867 for Charles County and unsuccessfully sought reelection in 1870. He later aligned himself with the Republican Party sometime after 1880 and defeated appointed incumbent Daniel Randall Magruder to win a seat as an associate judge of the Maryland Court of Appeals, serving from 1881 to 1890. He died at Idaho, his country home near La Plata, Maryland in 1899, and is interred in Mount Rest Cemetery of La Plata.

== Personal life ==
Frederick Stone married Maria Louisa Stonestreet on June 10, 1852. The couple had four daughter. Maria died in November 1867, and he married her sister, Jennie Stonestreet Ferguson, on June 15, 1870.

Stone died October 17, 1899.

== Notes ==
U.S. House of Representatives
Preceded by Benjamin G. Harris	Representative of the Fifth Congressional District of Maryland; 1867–1871	Succeeded by William Matthews Merrick
