= St. Thomas Manor =

Historic church in Maryland, United States

- U.S. National Register of Historic Places
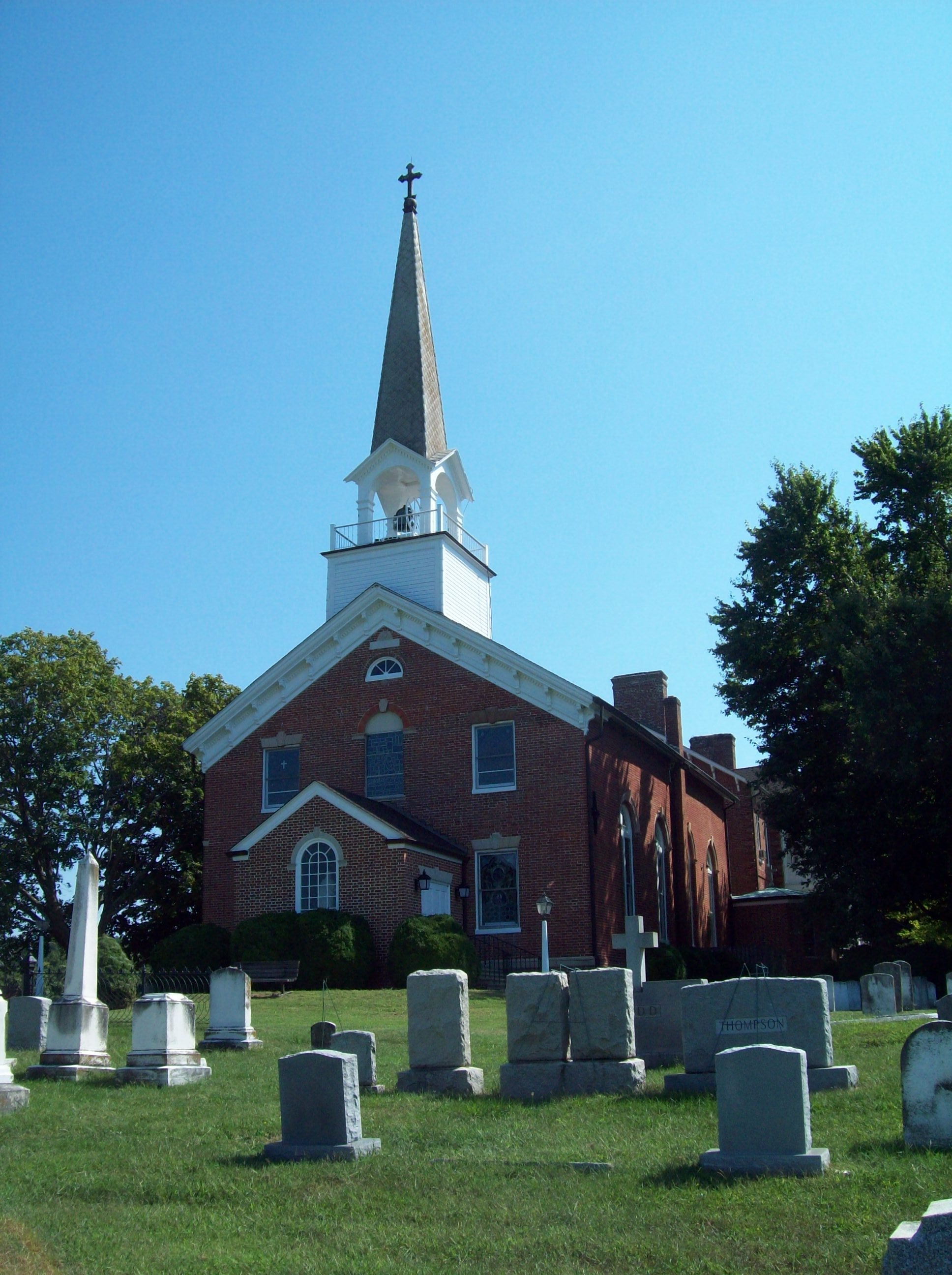
- St. Ignatius Church at St. Thomas Manor, September 2009

- Location within Maryland Location within the United States Location within the United States
- Location: Maryland Route 427/Chapel Point Rd., Port Tobacco
- Coordinates: 38°27′56″N 77°1′25″W
- Area: 10.7 acres (4.3 ha)
- Built: 1741
- Architectural style: Georgian
- NRHP reference No.: 88002050
- Added to NRHP: November 10, 1988

St. Thomas Manor (1741) is a historic home and Catholic church complex located near Port Tobacco, Charles County, Maryland. Known as St. Ignatius Church and Cemetery, the manor house complex is the oldest continuously occupied Jesuit residence in the world. The mission settlement of Chapel Point was established in 1641 by Father Andrew White, S.J., an English Jesuit missionary. Father White ministered to the Potapoco Native Americans, some of whom he converted to Catholicism. Established in 1662, this is the oldest continuously active Catholic parish in the American Thirteen Colonies. With the consecration in 1794 of Bishop John Carroll, St. Thomas became the first Catholic see in the United States.

== Description ==
The house is a two-story, seven-bay, brick structure of Georgian architecture, of Flemish bond construction. The mansion is the oldest surviving example of the Georgian style in Maryland. The manor house was built in 1741 as the headquarters of the Maryland Mission of the Society of Jesus, replacing an earlier structure. It served as the Superior's and later the Provincial's official residence. This house was also the nucleus of other missions in Maryland and the mid-Atlantic region.

Connected to the manor house stands a two-story brick wing that incorporates a former chapel built in 1798, now called St. Ignatius Church. Outbuildings are also significant, including a small, mid-19th century wood-frame slaves' quarter, "one of remarkably few such buildings to survive in this area." In addition, the former corn crib is the "largest structure of its type recorded in Charles County, and one that exhibits many construction features not represented elsewhere."

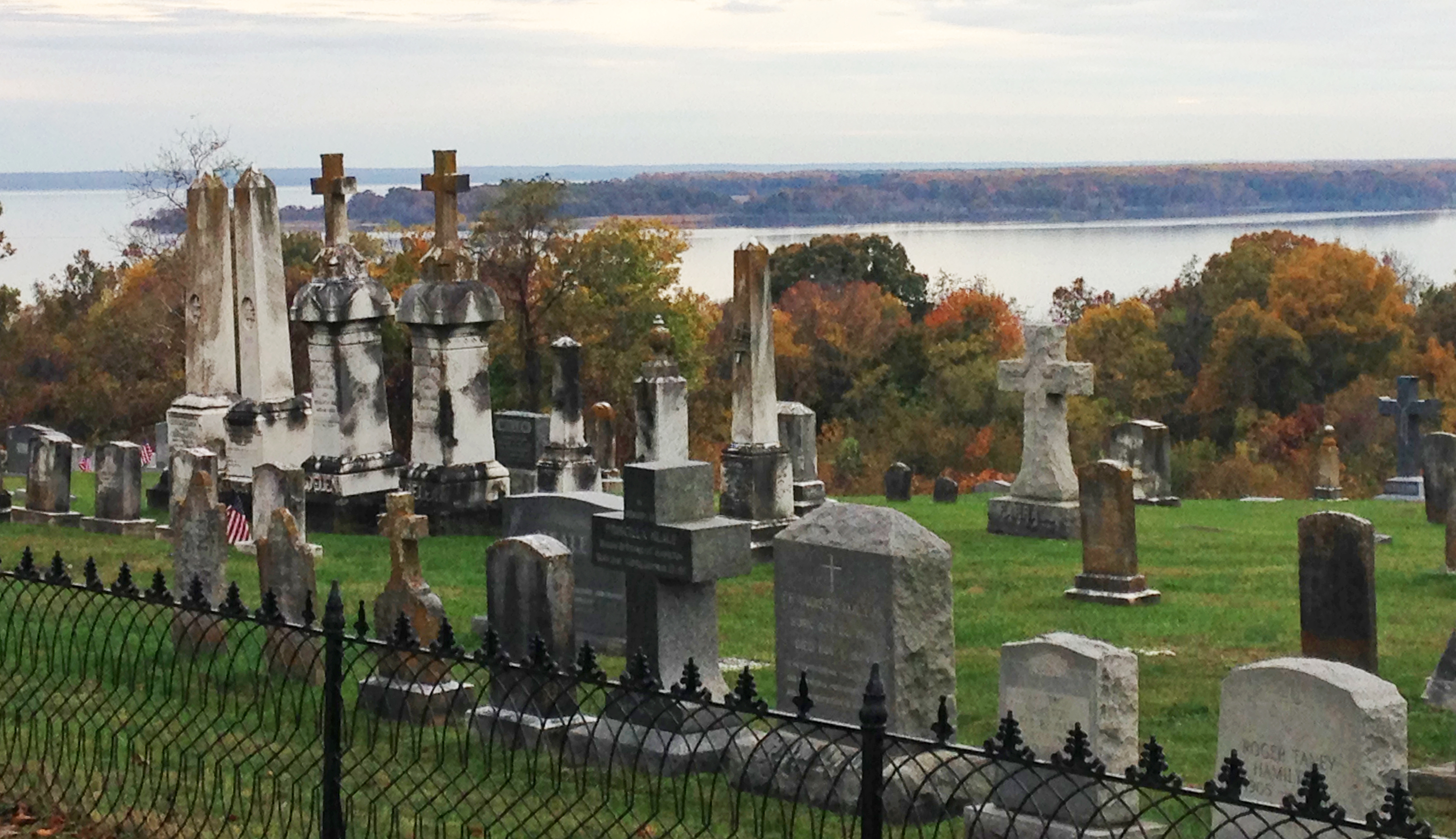
Cemetery at St. Ignatius Church, Chapel Point, Charles County, MD. The Port Tobacco River flows from the right to the Potomac River at far left.

A cemetery lies to the west of the manor house and church. Notable parishioners are buried there, including Confederate agent Olivia Floyd, La Plata benefactor Adrian Posey, judge Walter M. Digges, and U.S. Congressmen, Sydney Emanuel Mudd and Sydney Emanuel Mudd II.

St. Thomas Manor was listed on the National Register of Historic Places in 1988. Due to its history and scenic waterfront setting, the manor grounds, church and cemetery attract visitors from distant places. They make up a favorite rest-stop for many bicycle tour groups.

== Additional significance ==
In 1794 it was at St. Thomas Manor that John Carroll was invested in his robes as the first Catholic bishop of the United States of America, after the nation gained independence in the Revolutionary War. (He later traveled to London for official consecration as a bishop by the Vicar Apostolic.) This investiture established St. Thomas as the first Catholic see in the United States.

The St. Thomas complex was also the site of the revival of the Jesuit order in the United States in 1805, after it had been suppressed by the Catholic Church in 1773. Three American priests took their vows at St. Ignatius Church.

Some of the slaves owned by the Jesuit Maryland Province resided at St. Thomas Manor. They were among the 272 sold in 1838. In a letter, William McSherry, S.J. estimated that the sale of the enslaved persons would amount to approximately $16,000 equivalent to $483,750 in 2025. The Maryland Province Jesuits opposed the slave trade, but not slavery in practice.

== Catholic Church and Indian records ==
During the years of slavery and after the American Civil War, when most southern governments classified people as only black or white in a binary system related to the racial caste of slavery, St. Ignatius was among the Catholic parishes that continued to record their Native congregational members as Indian, regardless of whether they were of mixed race. In colonial and United States records, by contrast, the tribal identities of some Native Americans were lost when they were classified by outsiders as free people of color, "colored," or "white," regardless of how they identified ethnically. Research in Catholic records has helped some tribes document their continuous cultural history and identification as Native American, and to gain state and federal recognition as tribes since the late 20th century.

== Gallery ==
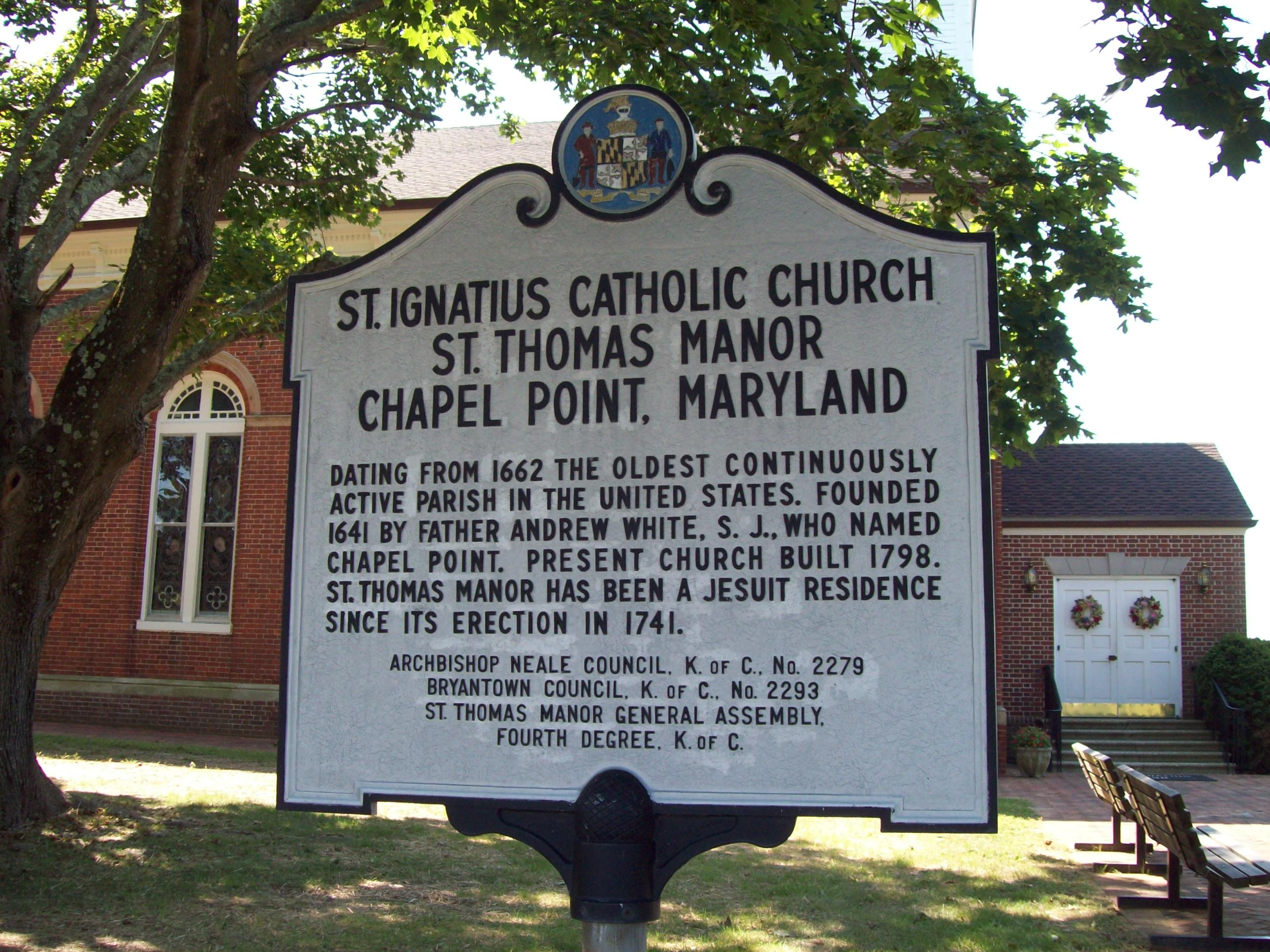
St. Thomas Manor, Historic Marker, September 2009

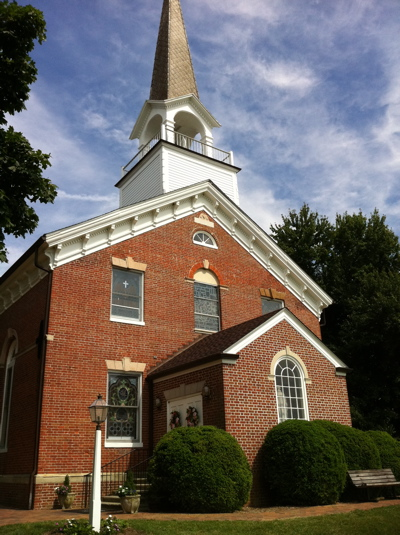
St. Thomas Manor, St. Ignatius Church, June 26, 2011.

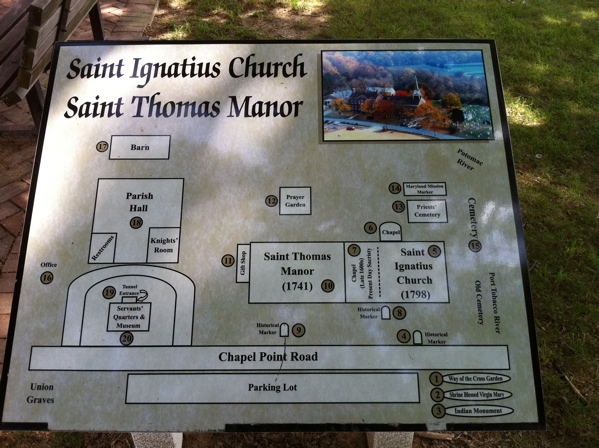
Explanatory sign at St. Thomas Manor, St. Ignatius Church, June 26, 2011.

== See also ==
- List of Jesuit sites
