= Stagg Hall =

Historic house in Maryland, United States

- U.S. National Register of Historic Places
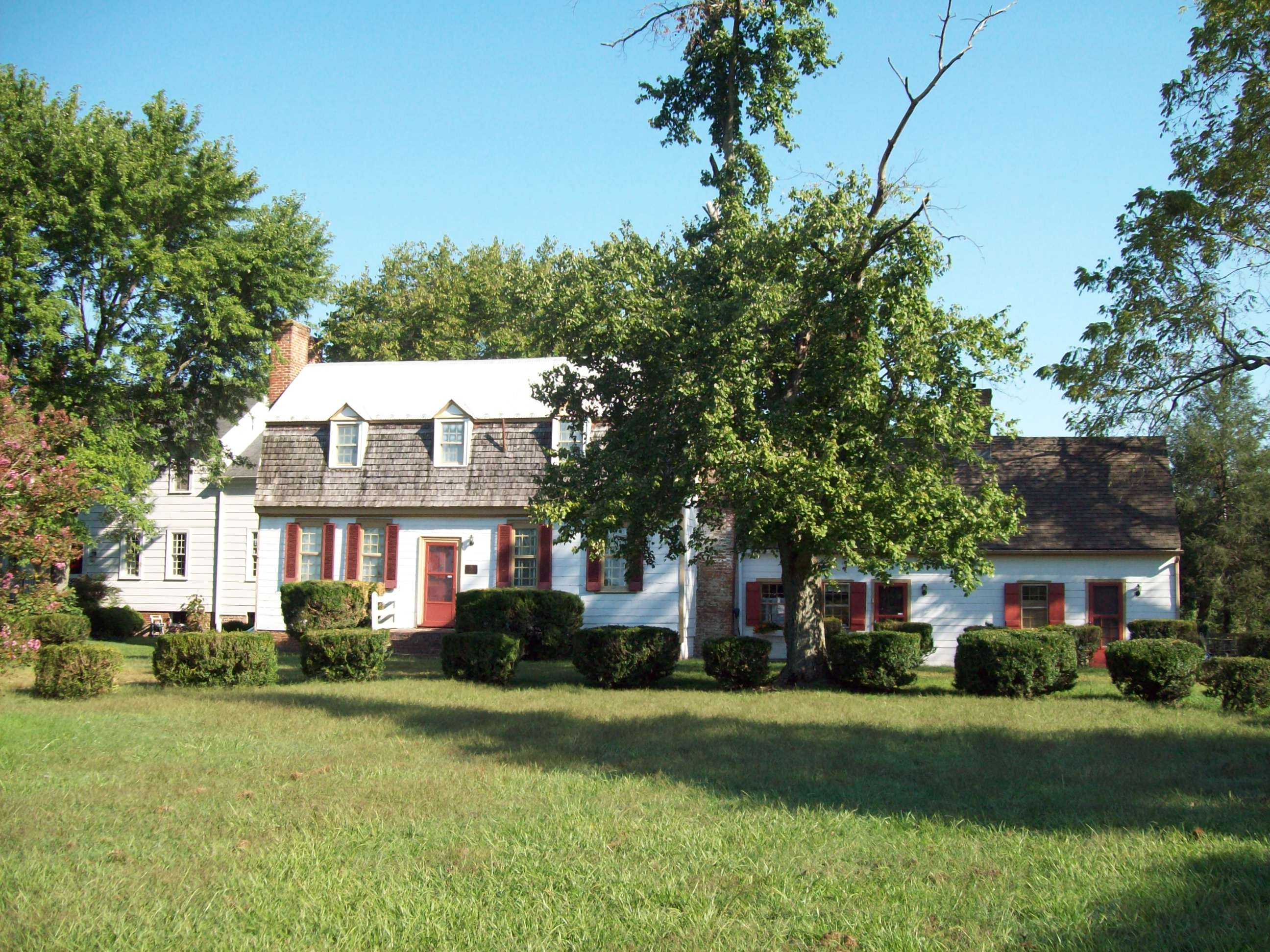
- Stagg Hall, September 2009

- Location within Maryland Location within the United States
- Location: CR 469/Chapel Point Rd., Port Tobacco, Maryland
- Coordinates: 38°30′42″N 77°1′11″W
- Area: 0.8 acres (0.32 ha)
- Built: 1740
- Architectural style: Colonial
- NRHP reference No.: 88003061
- Added to NRHP: December 29, 1988

Stagg Hall is a historic home located at Port Tobacco, Charles County, Maryland, United States. It is a two-story frame house built around 1766 adjacent to Port Tobacco's former town square. It was built by Thomas Howe Ridgate, a prosperous Port Tobacco merchant, who operated a mercantile business, Barnes and Ridgate.

Basil Richard Spalding acquired the property in 1828, and it became known as Spalding’s Square or Spalding’s Corner.

In 1903, Mary Lucilla Barbour purchased Stagg Hall from the William W. Padgett estate. After her death, her son, William Edgar Barbour, acquired the property from his father and siblings in 1934. In 1950, the heirs of William Edgar Barbour conveyed their interest in Stagg Hall to Robert Taylor Barbour and his wife, Phyllis, thus making them the owners of the property.

Woodwork from the first floor, which had been sold to the Art Institute of Chicago, was re-installed in 1972.

Stagg Hall was listed on the National Register of Historic Places in 1988.

Stagg Hall was acquired by the Charles County Government in 2013. Tours are available from March-December.

== See also ==
- Habre de Venture, a nearby home in a similar style, built by a signer of the Declaration of Independence.
