= Linden (Port Tobacco, Maryland) =

Historic house in Maryland, United States

- U.S. National Register of Historic Places
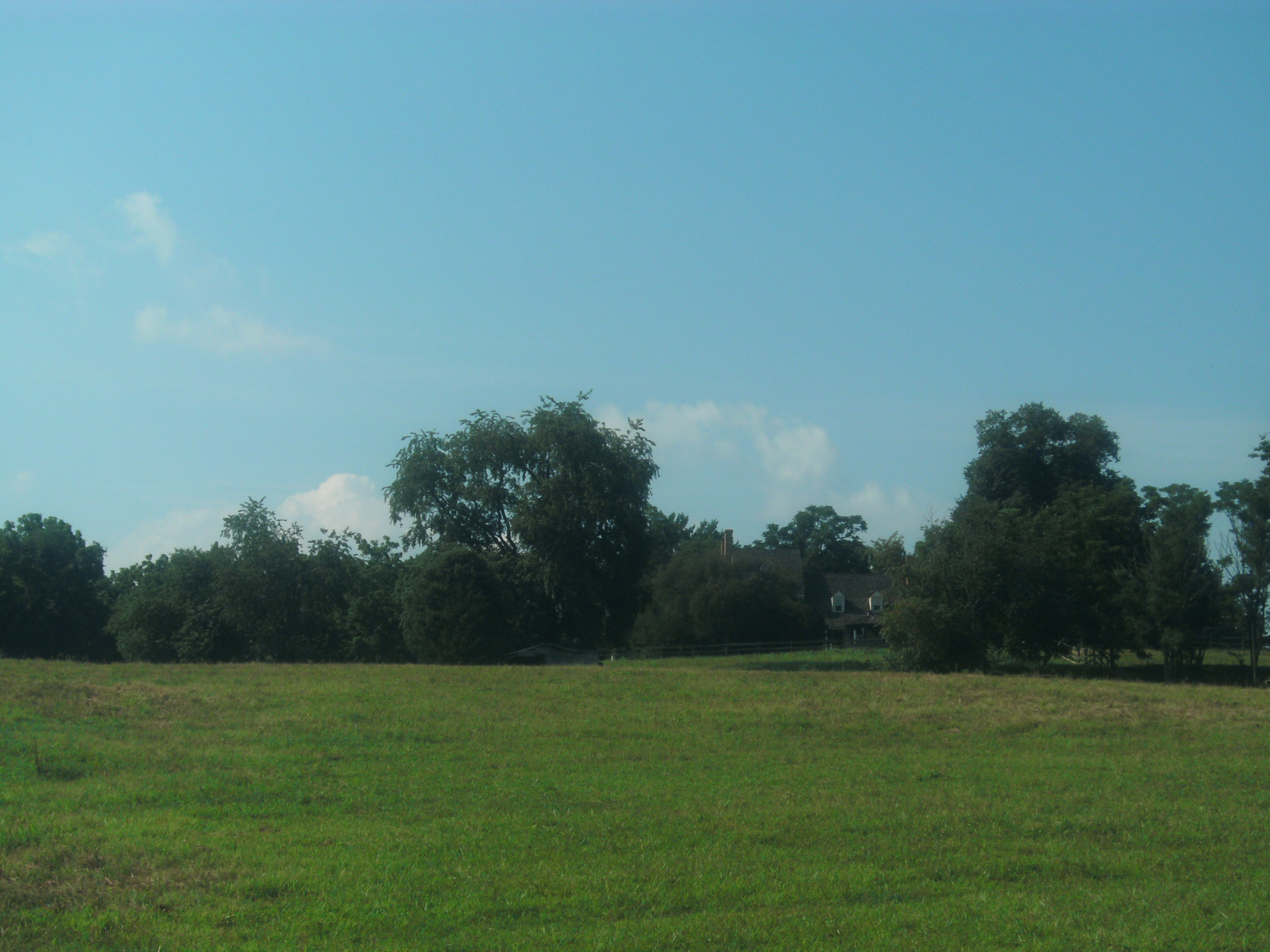

- Location within Maryland Location within the United States
- Nearest city: Port Tobacco, Maryland
- Coordinates: 38°33′16″N 77°0′46″W
- Built: 1783
- NRHP reference No.: 77000693
- Added to NRHP: November 23, 1977

Linden is a historic home located near Port Tobacco, Charles County, Maryland, United States. It is a rambling frame house, consisting of a 2 1/2-story main block with wings, embodying many traditional characteristics of Tidewater architecture. The house is situated on the crest of a hill overlooking the Port Tobacco Valley. The home was begun early in the 1780s and enlarged about 1800, and in the late 1830s. Linden was probably built as a summer residence about 1783, by Henry Barnes, a wealthy Port Tobacco merchant and on a property that remained in the same family for over 300 years.

Linden was listed on the National Register of Historic Places in 1977.
