= Gustavus Richard Brown =

American physician

Gustavus Richard Brown (October 17, 1747 – September 30, 1804) was a lifelong friend of George Washington's, a physician, helped found the hospital department of the Continental Army, and a botanist. He is best known as one of the doctors summoned to attend to George Washington the night he died.

== Biography ==
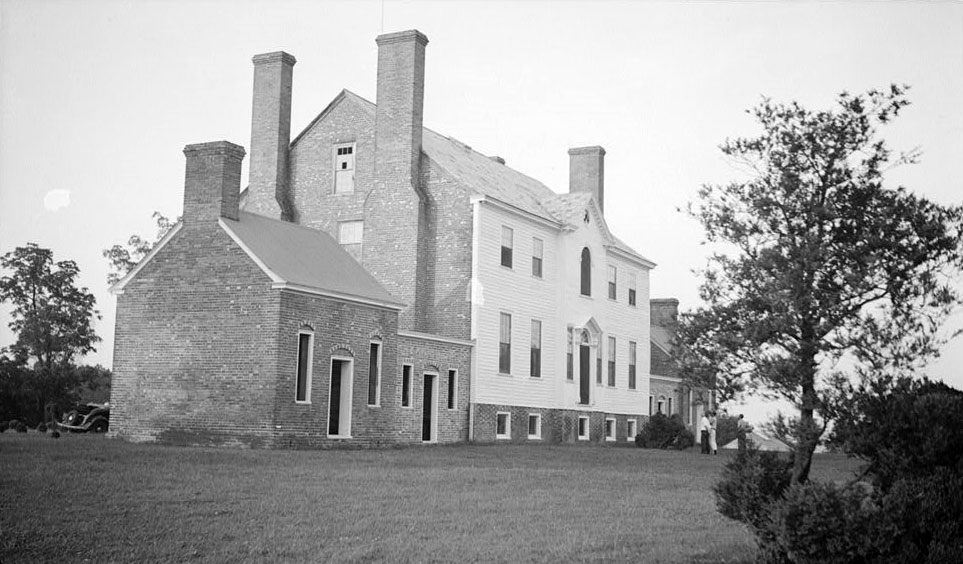
South elevation of Dr. Gustavus Brown's home Rose Hill on Rose Hill Road, vicinity of Port Tobacco, Charles County, Maryland. Built late 18th Century, restored 1937. Photograph by Thomas T. Waterman, 1940, for the Historic American Buildings Survey.

Gustavus Brown was born in Maryland, the son of Dr. Gustavus Brown, Sr.. The elder Dr. Brown was originally from Scotland and emigrated to Maryland where his son was born. Brown's father established a successful medical practice in Maryland, later becoming a wealthy planter who owned considerable amounts of land in both Scotland and in Maryland.

The younger Gustavus Brown followed in his father's footsteps to study medicine in Edinburgh, Scotland, graduating in 1768. In addition to medicine, he was elected to the legislature of Maryland, and served as a judge. He was a member of the Maryland state convention of 1788 and voted whether to ratify the U. S. Constitution. During the American Revolution, he helped establish the hospital department and was surgeon-general of the Continental Army. He was called on by General Washington to inspect the Maryland troops and enroll the names of able-bodied men. One of those men was his nephew, Gustavus Brown Horner, who, with the aid of his uncle's tutelage, became a surgeon's mate during the war.

Around 1780, he bought and combined four tracts of land from his neighbor, now known as "Betty's Delight". Combining this land with his own, he built and in about 1783 moved into Rose Hill, his manor house Rose Hill is adjacent to the Thomas Stone National Historic Site.

Along with Dr. James Craik, "Dr. Gustavus R. Brown, another prominent resident of Port Tobacco, and Dr. Elisha Cullen Dick, attended [George] Washington during his final illness, December 14, 1799. Dr. James Craik was so impressed with Dr. Brown's medical skills that he suggested to Mrs. Washington (Martha), that if any case should occur that was seriously alarming, she should send for Dr. Brown."

The Dr. Gustavus Brown Elementary School in Waldorf, Maryland is named after him. His younger sister, Margaret, married Thomas Stone, a signatory of the Declaration of Independence.

In some records Dr. Brown is confused with his father of the same name, who came from Dalkeith, Scotland in 1708. The elder Gustavus Brown settled at Middleton (named after his family homestead near Dalkeith, Scotland) in Charles County, Maryland, as relayed by his descendant Moncure Daniel Conway.
