= Olivia Floyd =

Anne Olivia Floyd (July 2, 1826 – December 8, 1905) was a Confederate spy during the American Civil War, noted as a blockade runner.

== Early life and education ==
Anne Olivia Floyd, known as Olivia, was the daughter of David I. and Sarah (Semmes) Floyd. Her mother inherited an interest in the property of Rose Hill near Port Tobacco, Maryland, about 1843, and Olivia lived there with her family. She never married.

== Civil War activities ==
During the American Civil War, Olivia Floyd became a spy and blockade runner for the Confederacy. She made numerous runs behind the lines between Washington, D.C., and the Confederate capital of Richmond, Virginia, and was said to have outwitted a company of Union soldiers. She conveyed papers, money and clothing from prisons and prisoners through the lines, and at one time, was holding $80,000 at Rose Hill to accomplish Confederate purposes. During the war, Union officials swore out an arrest warrant for her capture.

Olivia Floyd died peacefully at home on December 8, 1905, at Rose Hill in Charles County, Maryland.
