= Potapoco =

Native American people

Total population
- Extinct as a tribe

Regions with significant populations
- Maryland

Languages
- Eastern Algonquian

Religion
- Native American religion

Related ethnic groups
- Piscataway

The Potapoco were a tribe of Native Americans living in southern Maryland at the time of English colonization in the 17th century. The Potapoca were among the Atlantic coastal tribes speaking Algonquian languages, and they inhabited the area along what the English colonists later called the Port Tobacco River. They called their settlement Potopaco.

Overall, the dominant tribe on the north side of the Potomac River was the Algonquian Piscataway tribe, which later absorbed some of the smaller tribe's survivors. Upon absorption, the Potapoco became a sub-tribe of the Piscataway.
