= Rose Hill (Port Tobacco, Maryland) =

Historic house in Maryland, United States

- U.S. National Register of Historic Places
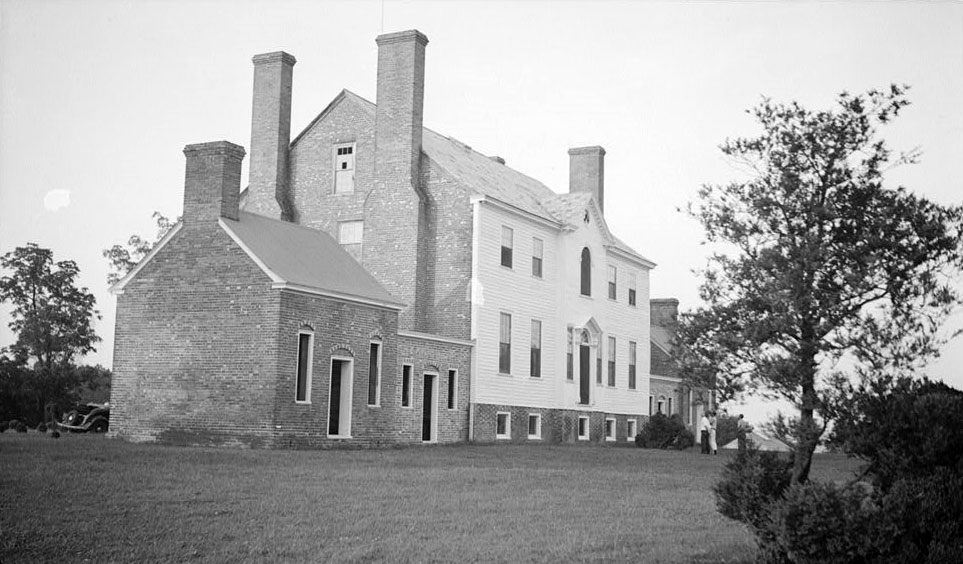
- South elevation of Dr. Gustavus Brown's Rose Hill on Rose Hill Road, vicinity of Port Tobacco, Charles County, Maryland. Built late 18th Century, restored 1937. Photograph by Thomas T. Waterman, 1940, for the Historic American Buildings Survey

- Location within Maryland Location within the United States
- Location: Rose Hill Rd., Port Tobacco, Maryland
- Coordinates: 38.51840441322239°N 77.02728397457999°W
- Area: 602.2 acres (243.7 ha)
- Built: 1715
- Architectural style: Georgian
- NRHP reference No.: 73000914
- Added to NRHP: March 30, 1973

Rose Hill is a historic house built in the late 18th century near Port Tobacco in Charles County, Maryland, United States. It is a five-part, Georgian-style dwelling house. It has a two-story central block with gable ends. It was restored during the mid 20th century.

Rose Hill was listed on the National Register of Historic Places in 1973.

== Significance related to residents ==
It is notable for the following:

- Dr. Gustavus R. Brown, a lifelong friend of George Washington and one of his physicians, built the house and lived here.
- Olivia Floyd (1826-1905), a noted Confederate agent and blockade runner during the American Civil War, lived here
- It is the reputed site of the Port Tobacco Blue Dog Legend

=== Dr. Gustavus Richard Brown ===
Around 1780, Dr. Gustavus Brown bought and combined four tracts of land from his neighbor; the property is now known as "Betty's Delight". Combining this land with his own, he had built the house later named Rose Hill, which was completed in about 1783.

The house has been owned by a number of families since it was built. It was restored in 1937 and more recently in the early 1970s by Charles Stuart.

=== Olivia Floyd ===
The Maryland archives appear to show that Rose Hill Farm (with the manor) was sold to Ignatius Semmes, but do not provide a clear account, i.e., whether it was to the elder Semmes (born 1773), or the younger (born 1821), and when this took place (from 1804 to the early 1820s). Another Gustavus Brown is mentioned more than once in the same area, up to 1826. But the archives do show that older Semmes died in 1826, and the younger Semmes died in 1843, willing the property to his maternal uncle Holmes and paternal aunt Sarah (Semmes) Floyd, married to David I. Floyd, and her children.

Olivia Floyd was among the family of Sarah and David Floyd who lived at the manor. She is notable as a Confederate agent and blockade runner during the American Civil War. Floyd sold the property to Maryland State Senator, Adrian Posey, in 1892.

=== The Blue Dog ===
Port Tobacco Village, at the bottom of Rose Hill, is a town. Rose Hill Road (which is outside Port Tobacco) passes a few widely scattered houses, most notably the home of Thomas Stone, youngest signatory of the American Declaration of Independence.

== Gallery ==
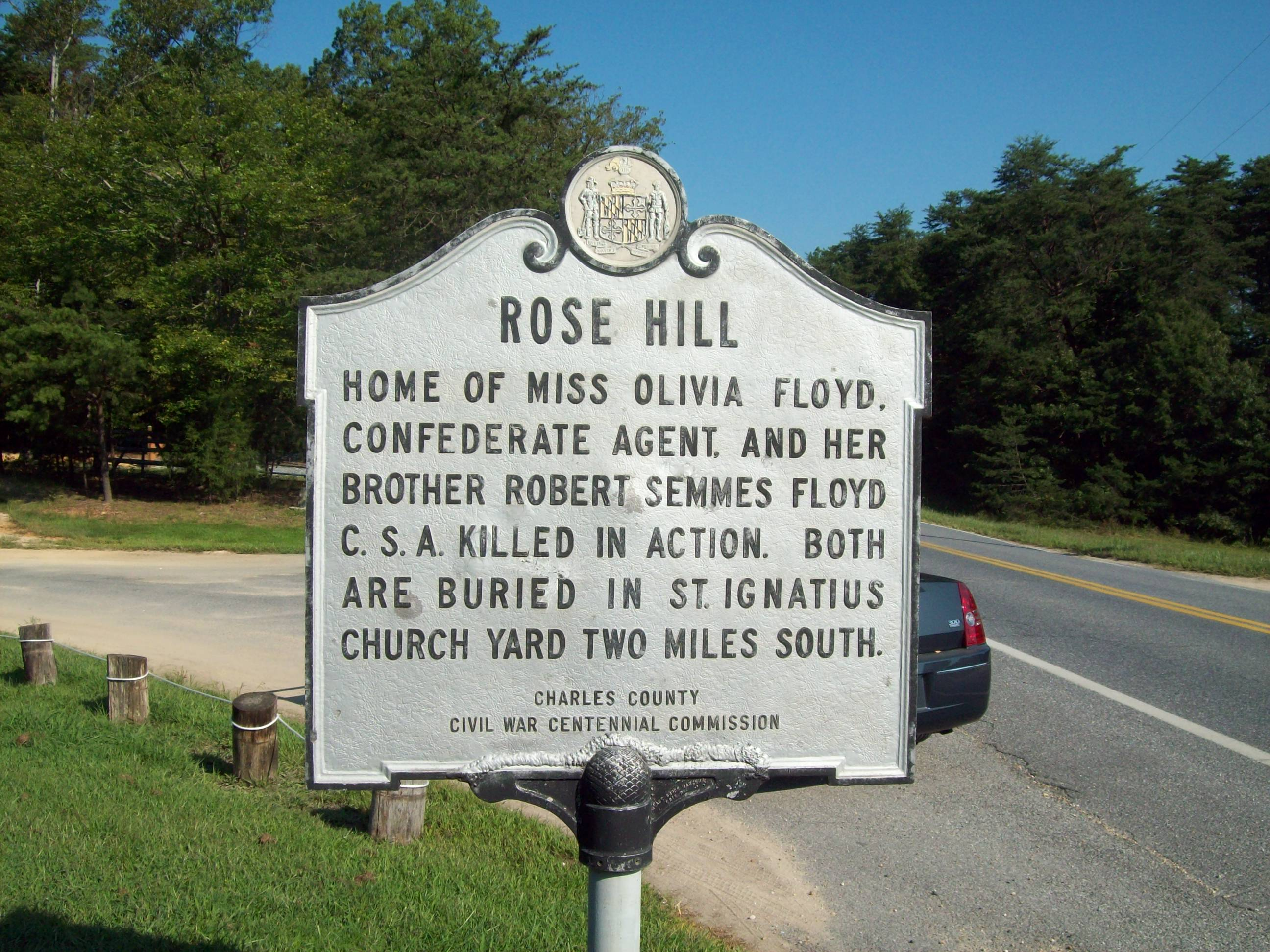
Rose Hill Historic Marker, September 2009

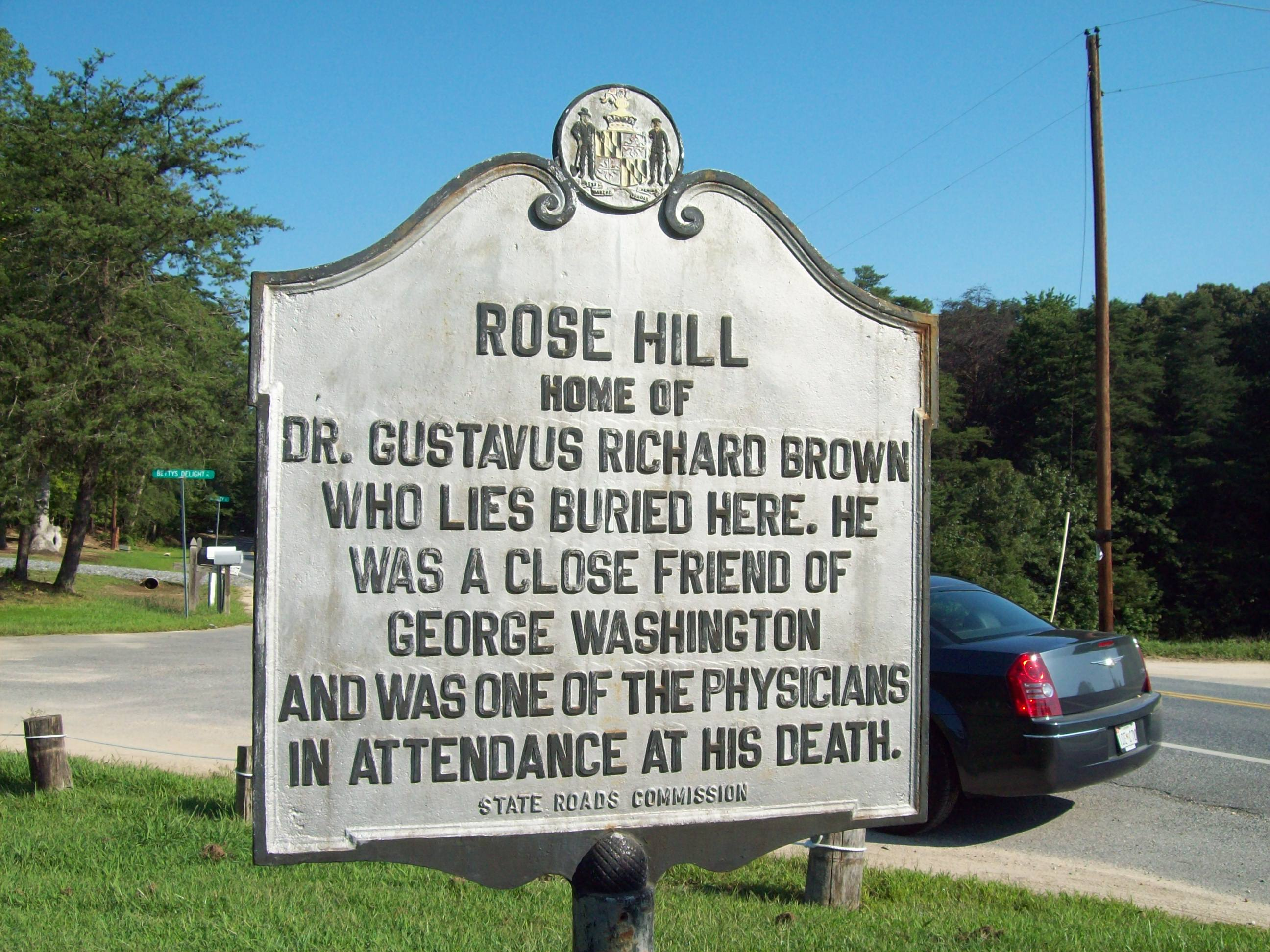
Rose Hill Historic Marker, September 2009
