= Thomas Stone =

American Founding Father and politician (1743–1787)

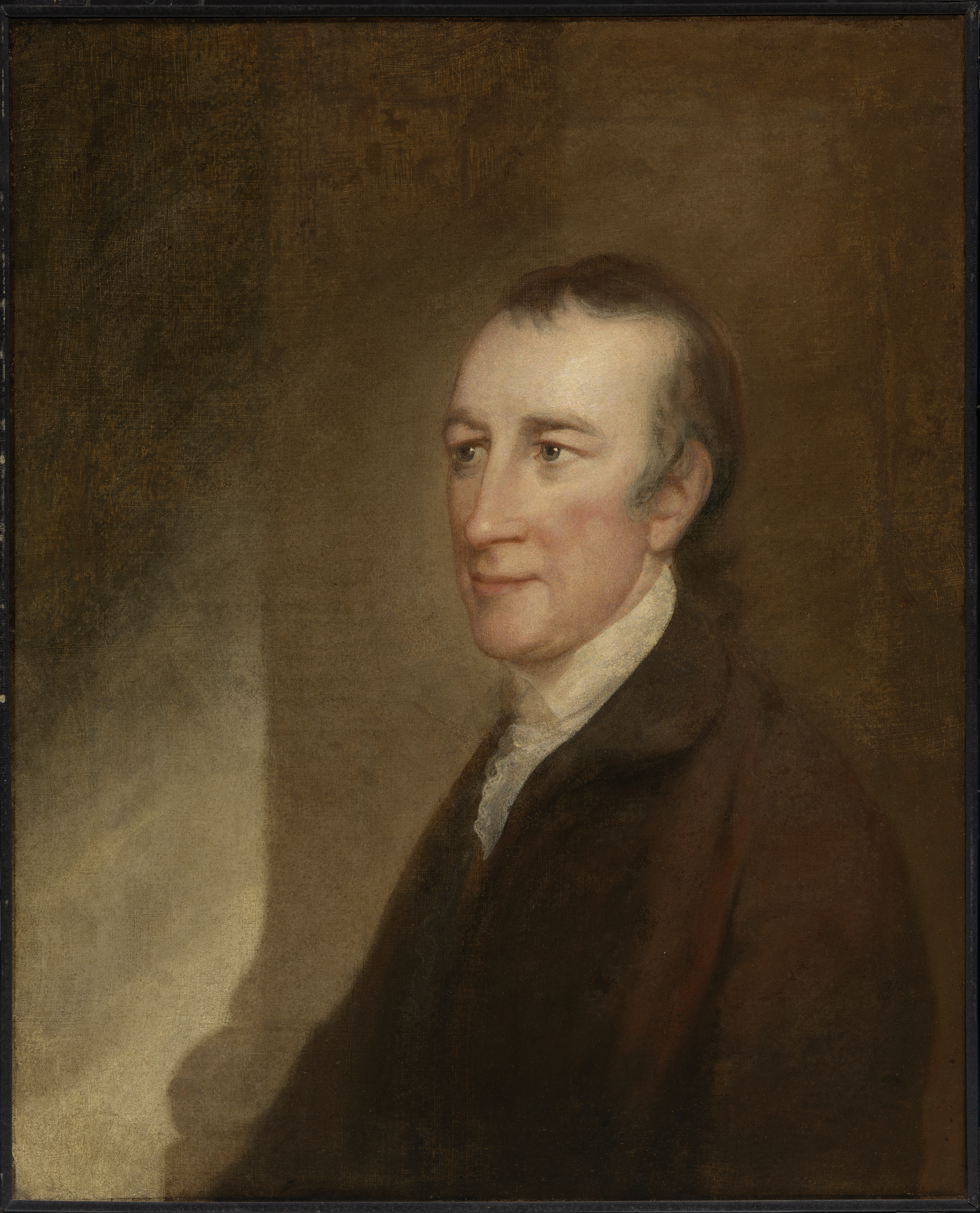
- Thomas Stone by Robert Edge Pine, c. 1785

Member of the Maryland Senate
- In office 1781–1787
- In office 1777–1780

Personal details
- Born: 1743 Charles County, Province of Maryland, British America
- Died: October 5, 1787 (aged 43–44) Alexandria, Virginia, U.S.
- Resting place: Thomas Stone National Historic Site
- Relations: Michael Stone (brother); John Hoskins Stone (brother); Daniel of St. Thomas Jenifer (uncle)
- Known for: Signer of the United States Declaration of Independence

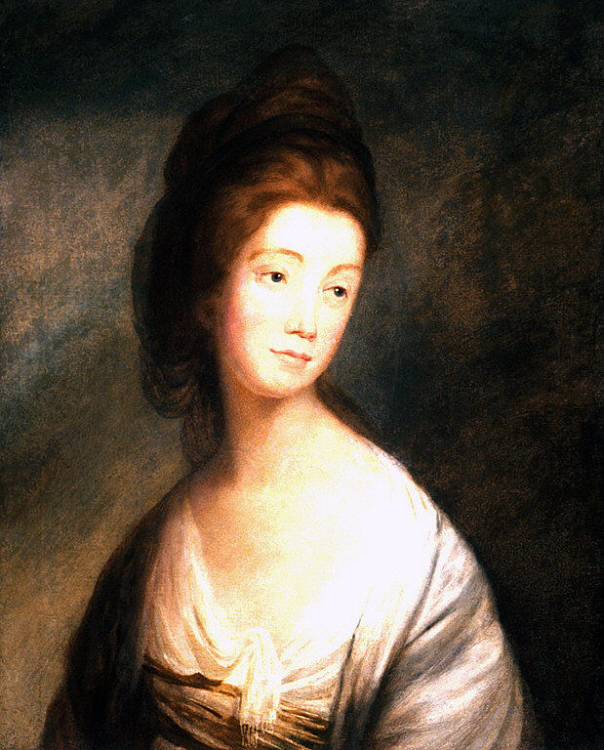
Margaret Brown Stone

Thomas Stone (1743 – October 5, 1787) was an American Founding Father, planter, politician, and lawyer who signed the United States Declaration of Independence as a delegate for Maryland. He later worked on the committee that formed the Articles of Confederation in 1777. He acted as president of Congress for a short time in 1784. Stone was a member of the Maryland Senate from 1777 to 1780 and again from 1781 to 1787.

== Early life and education ==
Coat of Arms of Thomas Stone

Stone was born into a prominent family at Poynton Manor in Charles County, Maryland. He was the second son in the large family of David (1709–1773) and Elizabeth Jenifer Stone. His brothers, Michael Jenifer Stone and John Hoskins Stone, were also prominent in politics. His uncle was Daniel of St. Thomas Jenifer. Thomas read law at the office of Thomas Johnson in Annapolis, was admitted to the bar in 1764, and opened a practice in Frederick, Maryland. The Jenifer family was of Swedish origin.

== Career ==
As the American Revolution neared, Stone joined the committee of correspondence for Charles County. From 1774 to 1776, he was a member of Maryland's Annapolis Convention. In 1775, the convention sent Stone as a delegate to the Continental Congress. He was re-elected and attended regularly for several years. On May 15, 1776, he voted in favor of drafting a declaration of independence, in spite of restrictions from the Maryland convention that prevented their delegates from supporting it. In June the restriction was lifted, so Maryland's delegates were free to vote for Independence. Previously, Stone had been in favor of opening diplomatic relations with Great Britain and not going to war, as he was not only a pacifist but a conservative reluctant to start a gruesome war.

That same year Stone was assigned to the committee that drafted the Articles of Confederation, and he was struck with a personal tragedy. His wife Margaret visited him in Philadelphia, which was in the midst of a smallpox epidemic. She was inoculated for the disease, but an adverse reaction to the treatment made her ill. Her health continued to decline for the rest of her life. After Stone signed the Declaration of Independence, he took his wife home and declined future appointment to the Congress, except for part of 1784, when the meetings were at Annapolis.

Stone accepted election to the Maryland Senate from 1779 until 1785, at first in order to promote the Articles of Confederation, which Maryland was the last state to approve. But he gave up the practice of law to care for his wife and children. As her health continued to decline, he gradually withdrew from public life. When Margaret died in 1787, he became depressed and died less than four months later in Alexandria, Virginia, reportedly of a "broken heart".

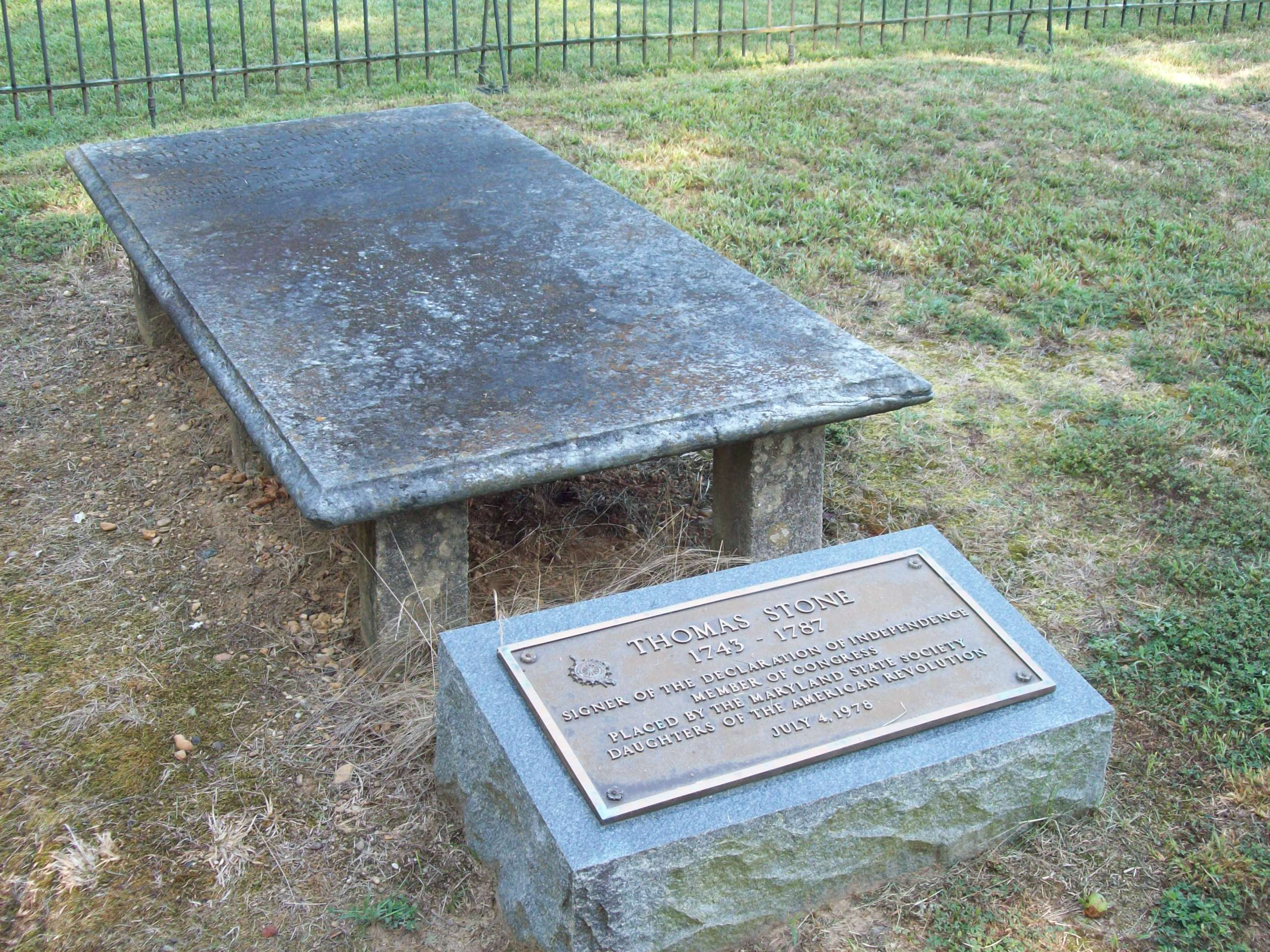
Grave of Thomas Stone, September 2009

Stone was buried at his plantation home, which still stands. After his death, the plantation remained in the family for five generations until 1936 when it sold privately. In 1977 the main structure was severely damaged by fire. The National Park Service purchased the property and restored it to its original plans. Habredeventure today is the centerpiece of the Thomas Stone National Historic Site and is operated as a museum by the National Park Service.

== Personal life ==
In 1768, Stone married Margaret Brown (1751–1787), the younger sister of Gustavus R. Brown (see Rose Hill), thought to be the richest man in the county. Soon after, Stone purchased his first 400 acres (1.6 km^{2}) and began the construction of his estate named Habre de Venture. The family made their home there, and they had three children: Margaret (1771–1809), Mildred (1773–1837) and Fredrik (1774–1793). Stone's law practice kept him away from home, so he brought in his younger brother Michael to manage development of the plantation, which utilized slaves for generations.

== Legacy and honors ==
- The World War II Liberty Ship SS Thomas Stone was named in his honor.
- Thomas Stone High School – Charles County, Maryland public high school
- Memorial to the 56 Signers of the Declaration of Independence

== See also ==
- William Stone – relative and governor of the Maryland colony
- John Hoskins Stone – brother and governor of Maryland
- Peggy Stewart House – National Historic Landmark in Annapolis, Maryland, at one time owned by Thomas Stone
- Barton W. Stone – cousin and prominent early leader of the Restoration Movement
