= Port Tobacco River =

Coordinates: 38°27′28″N 77°2′6″W

Location
- Country: United States
- State: Maryland
- County: Charles County

Physical characteristics
- Mouth
  - location: Potomac River
  - elevation: 0 feet (0 m)
- Length: 4.2 mi (6.8 km)

The Port Tobacco River is a tidal tributary of the Potomac River in Charles County, Maryland, in the United States. The river is about 4.2 miles (6.8 km) long. Port Tobacco, the county seat of Charles County from 1658 to 1895, was an active port until that portion of the river became silted and unnavigable. When the railroad bypassed the town, business declined, and the county seat was moved to La Plata, Maryland.
