= Thomas Stone National Historic Site =

National Historic Site of the United States

- Location within Maryland Location within the United States
- Location: Charles County, Maryland
- Nearest city: Port Tobacco Village
- Coordinates: 38°31′52.2″N 77°2′21.3″W
- Established: November 10, 1978
- Visitors: 4,910 (in 2025)
- Governing body: National Park Service
- Website: Thomas Stone National Historic Site
- Habre-de-Venture; Thomas Stone National Historic Site
- U.S. National Register of Historic Places
- U.S. National Historic Site
- U.S. National Historic Landmark
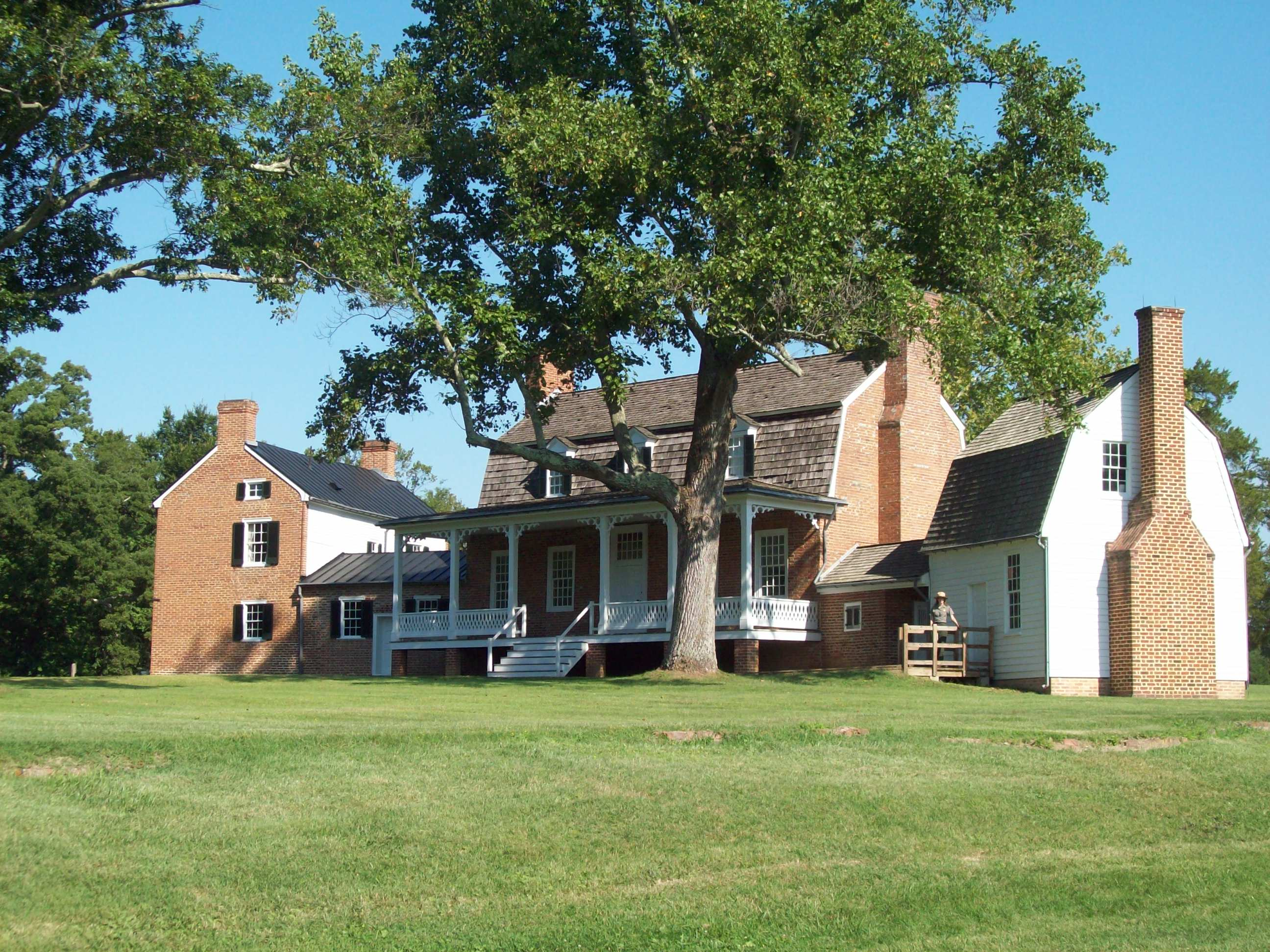
- Haberdeventure, Front View, September 2009
- Location: 6655 Rose Hill Rd., near jct. with MD 225 and 6, Port Tobacco, Maryland
- Area: 360 acres (145.7 ha)
- Built: 1771
- Architectural style: Georgian
- Visitation: 4,500 (2005)
- NRHP reference No.: 72001595

Significant dates
- Added to NRHP: October 31, 1972
- Designated NHS: November 10, 1978
- Designated NHL: November 11, 1971

The Thomas Stone National Historic Site, also known as Haberdeventure or the Thomas Stone House, is a United States National Historic Site located about 25 miles (40 km) south of Washington, D.C. in Charles County, Maryland. The site was established to protect the home and property of Founding Father Thomas Stone, one of the 56 signers of the United States Declaration of Independence. His home and estate were owned by the Stone family until 1936.

== History ==
Stone purchased Haberdeventure in 1770 and began construction of a new home in 1771. Stone's original plan was to build a small, modest home for him, his wife Margaret, and their two daughters but before the house was completed, his father died and five of his younger brothers and sisters came to live with him at Haberdeventure creating the need for larger living quarters. During the 1780s, the Haberdeventure plantation probably supported about 25 to 35 people, including a number of slaves. By the time of Stone's death in 1787, Haberdeventure had increased in size from 442 acres (1.79 km^{2}) to 1,077 acres (4.36 km^{2}). Stone was buried in the family cemetery adjacent to his home.

Descendants of Thomas Stone continued to own Haberdeventure until 1936 when the land was sold.

The house was declared a National Historic Landmark in 1971. The brickwork of the house is done in Flemish bond.

The property was privately owned until 1977 when a fire severely damaged the central section of the house. Haberdeventure was authorized as a National Historic Site a year later in 1978 and was purchased by the National Park Service in 1981. Restoration efforts on the historic structures began at this time but the house was not opened to the public until 1997.

Today, a visitor center located at the site has exhibits on the Declaration of Independence and the life of Thomas Stone. Guided tours of Haberdeventure are also offered. In 2008, the Thomas Stone National Historic Site ranked 344th among 360 sites where the National Park Service tracks attendance with 5,720 visitors.

== Gallery ==
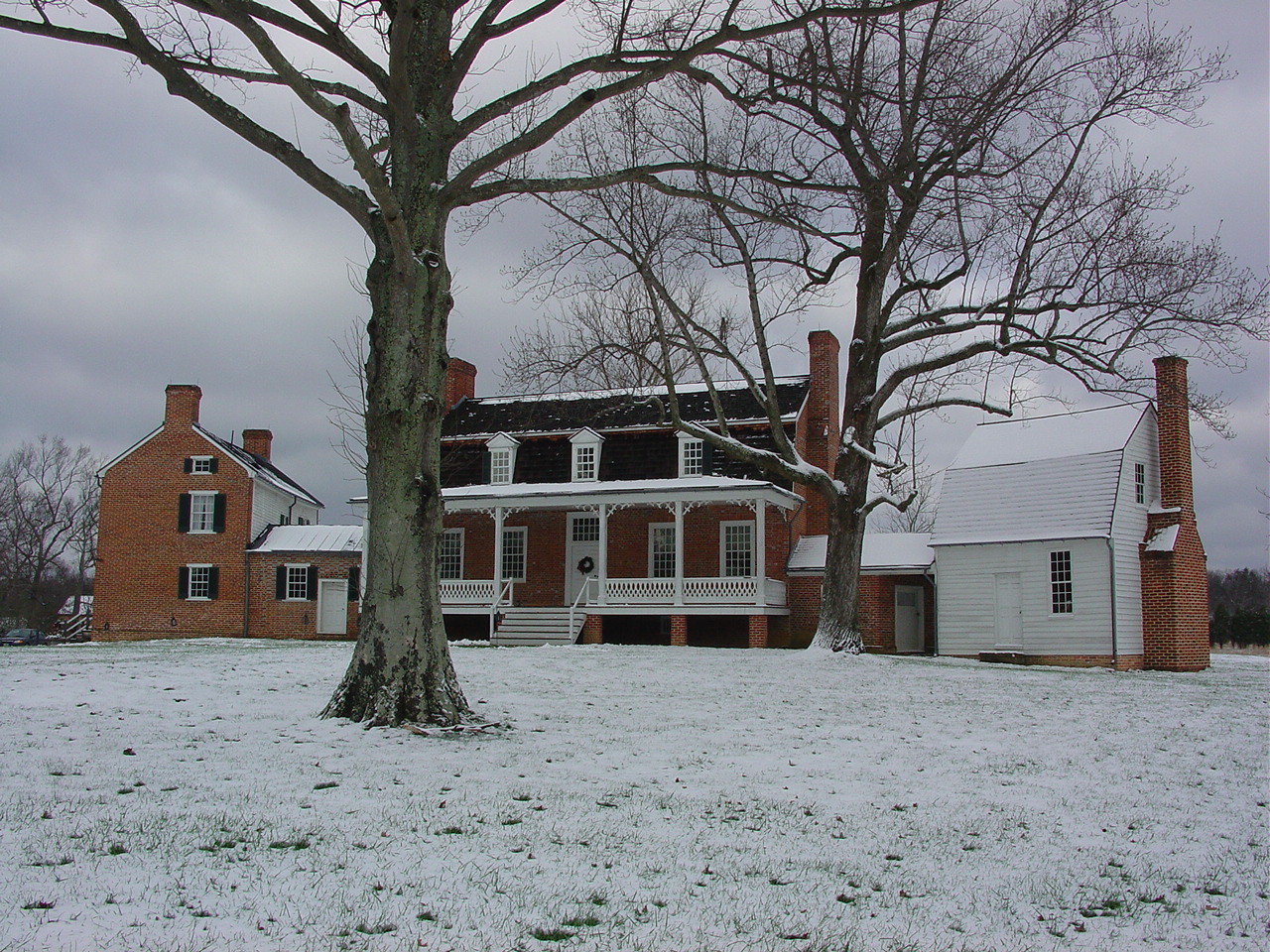
Haberdeventure, front, winter view

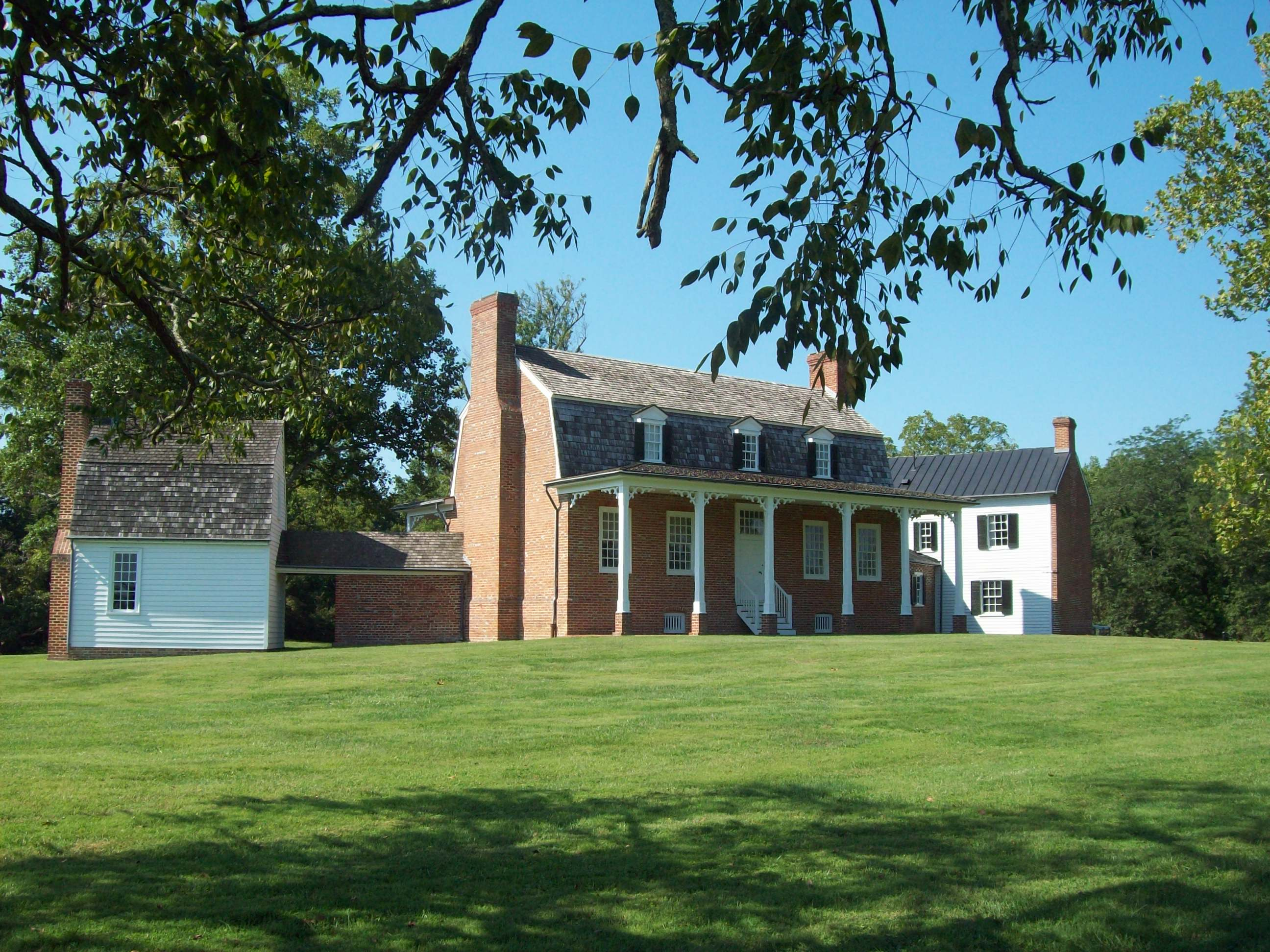
Haberdeventure, rear view, September 2009

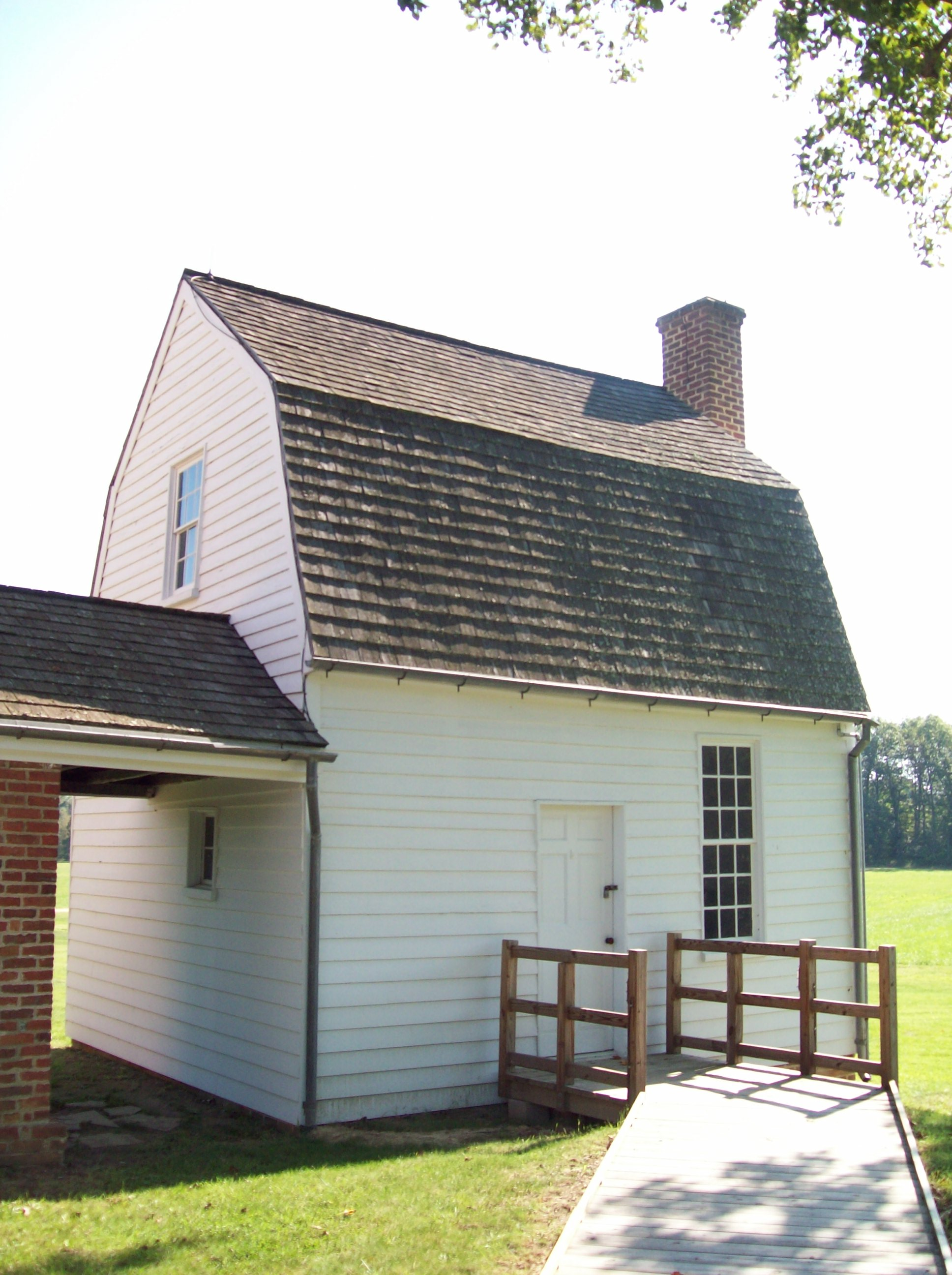
Haberdeventure, detail of original home, September 2009

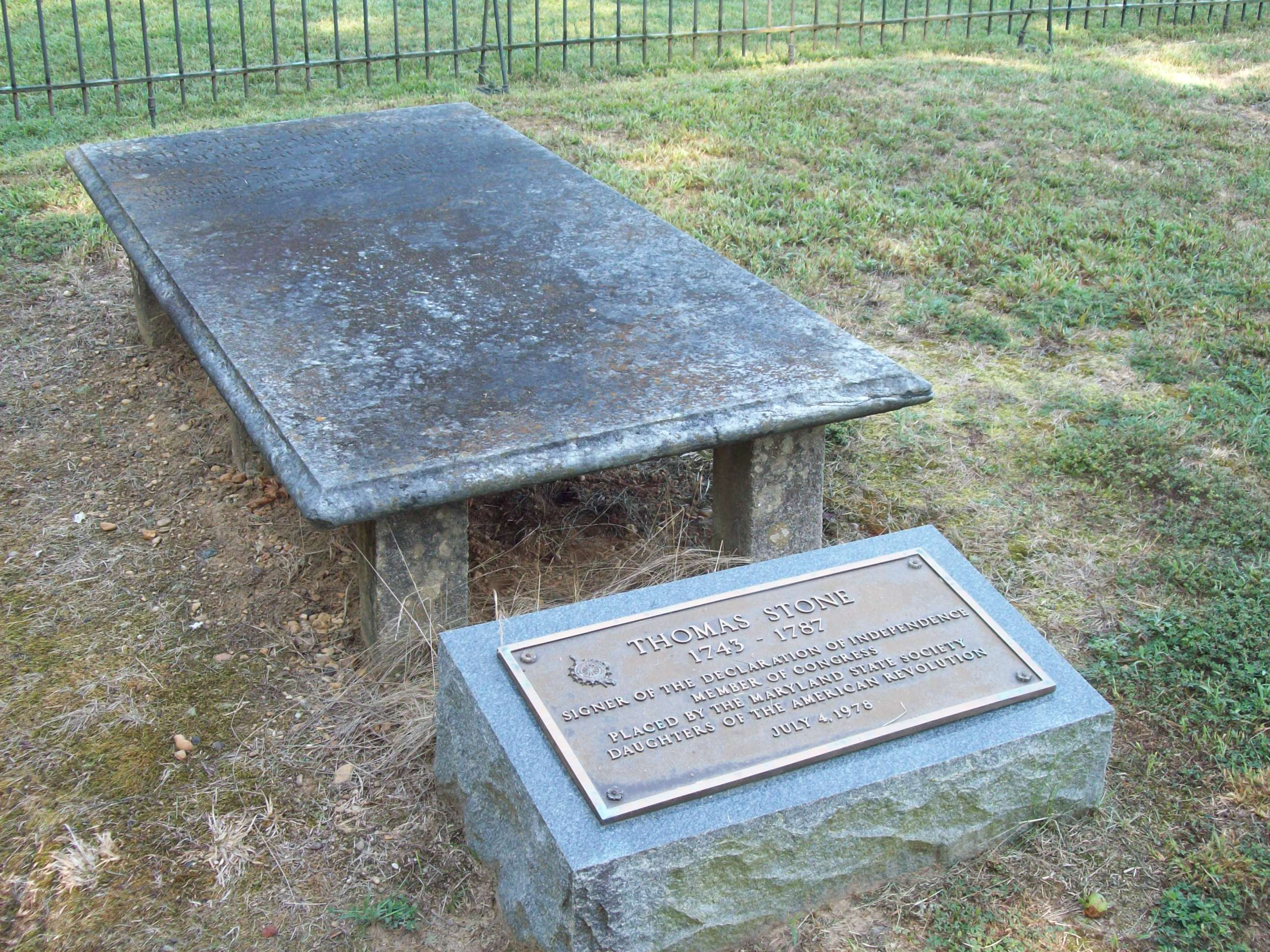
Grave of Thomas Stone, September 2009

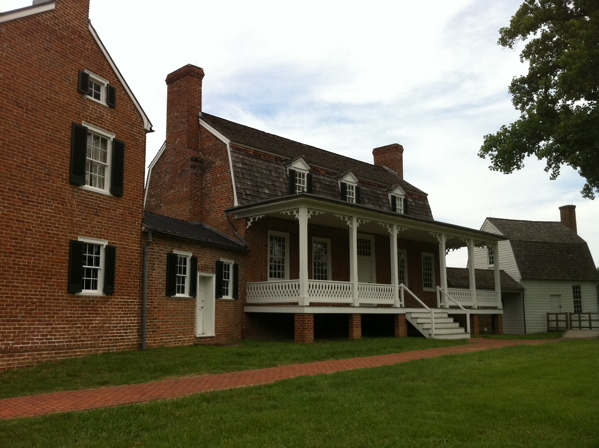
Haberdeventure, detail of main house and dependencies, from the north, 26 June 2011

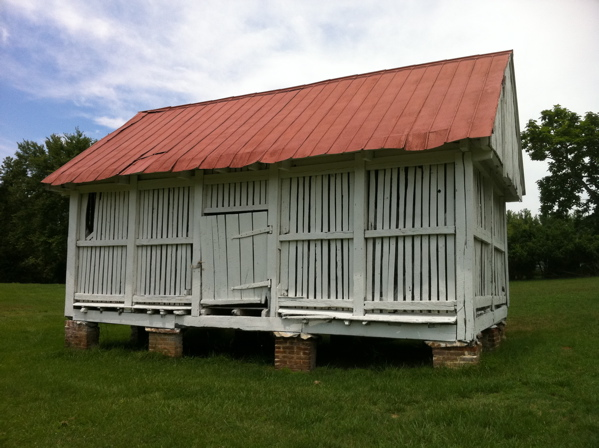
Haberdeventure, corn crib, 26 June 2011

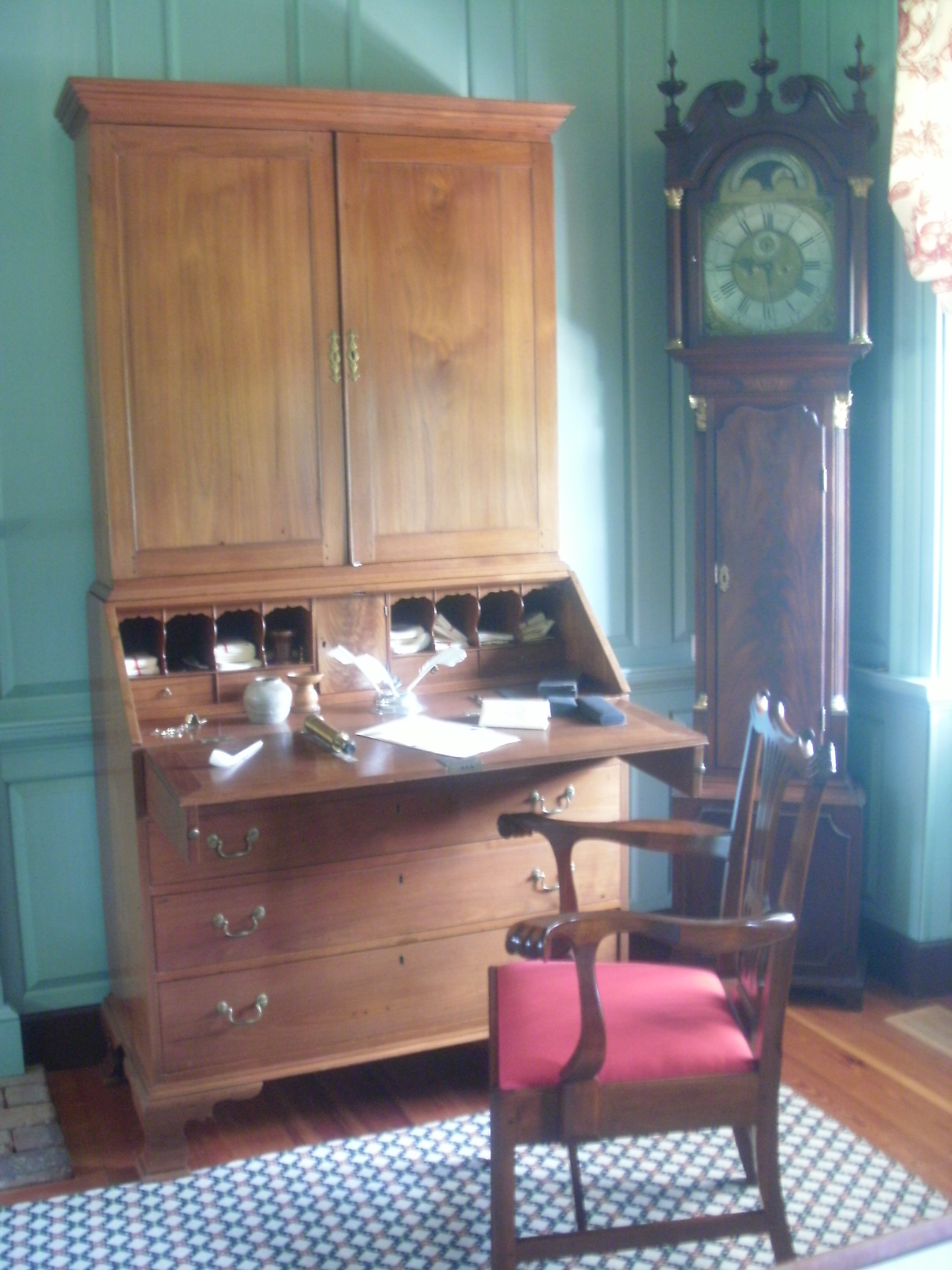
Artifacts on display in the parlor of the home, July 2016

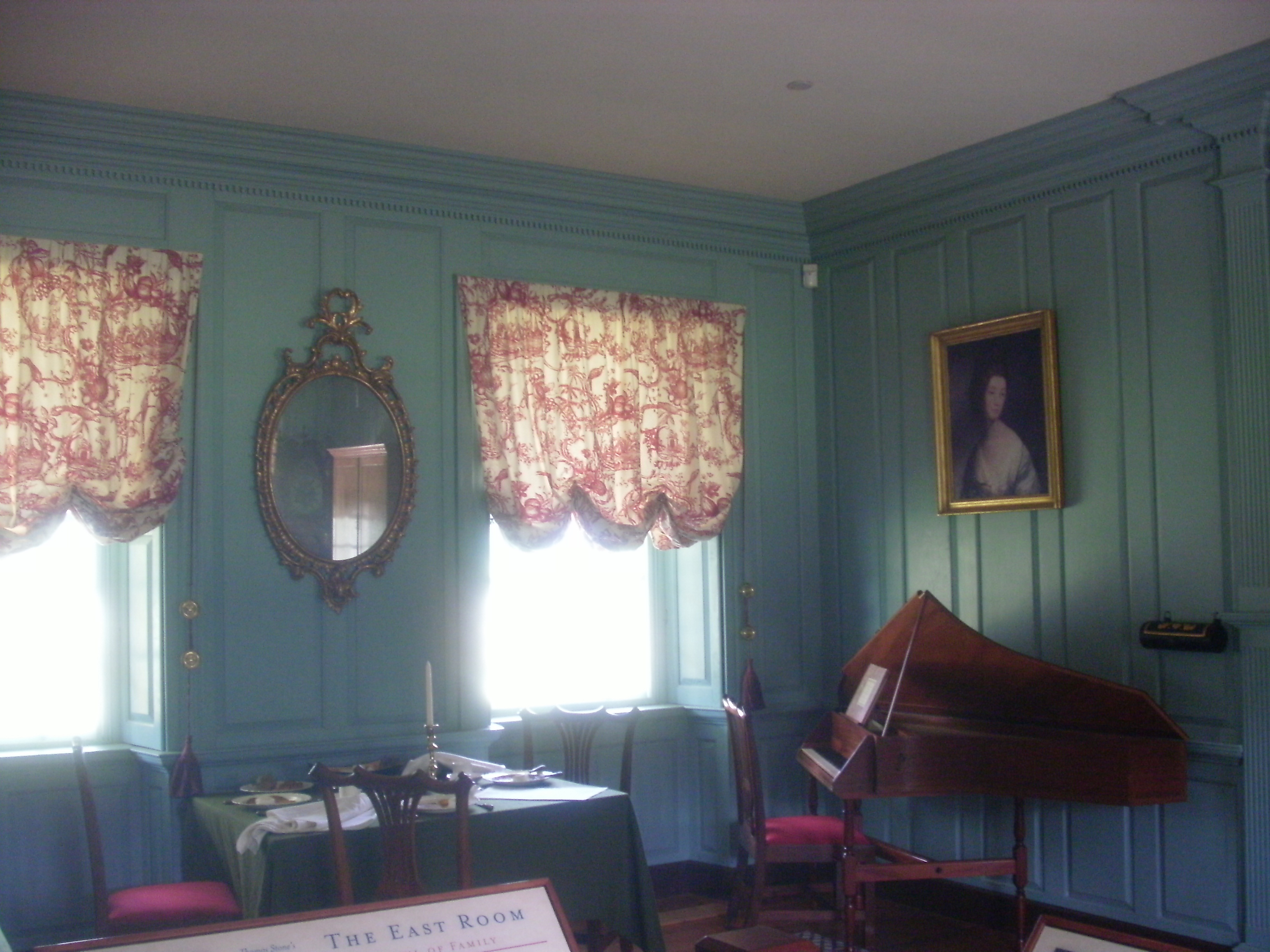
Parlor. Portrait of Margaret Stone is replica of one by Robert Edge Pine. July 2016

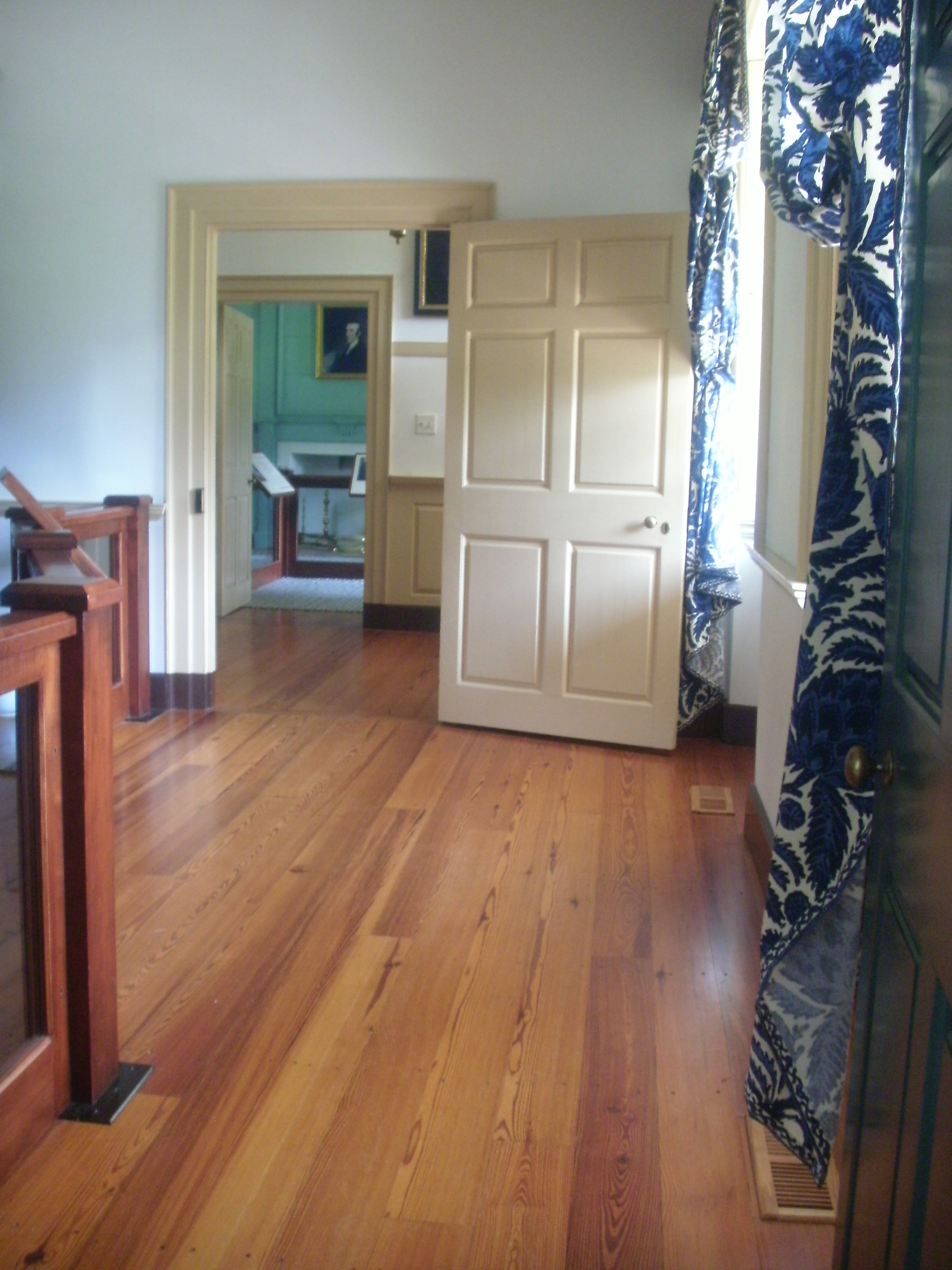
A view through the bedroom into the parlor, July 2016

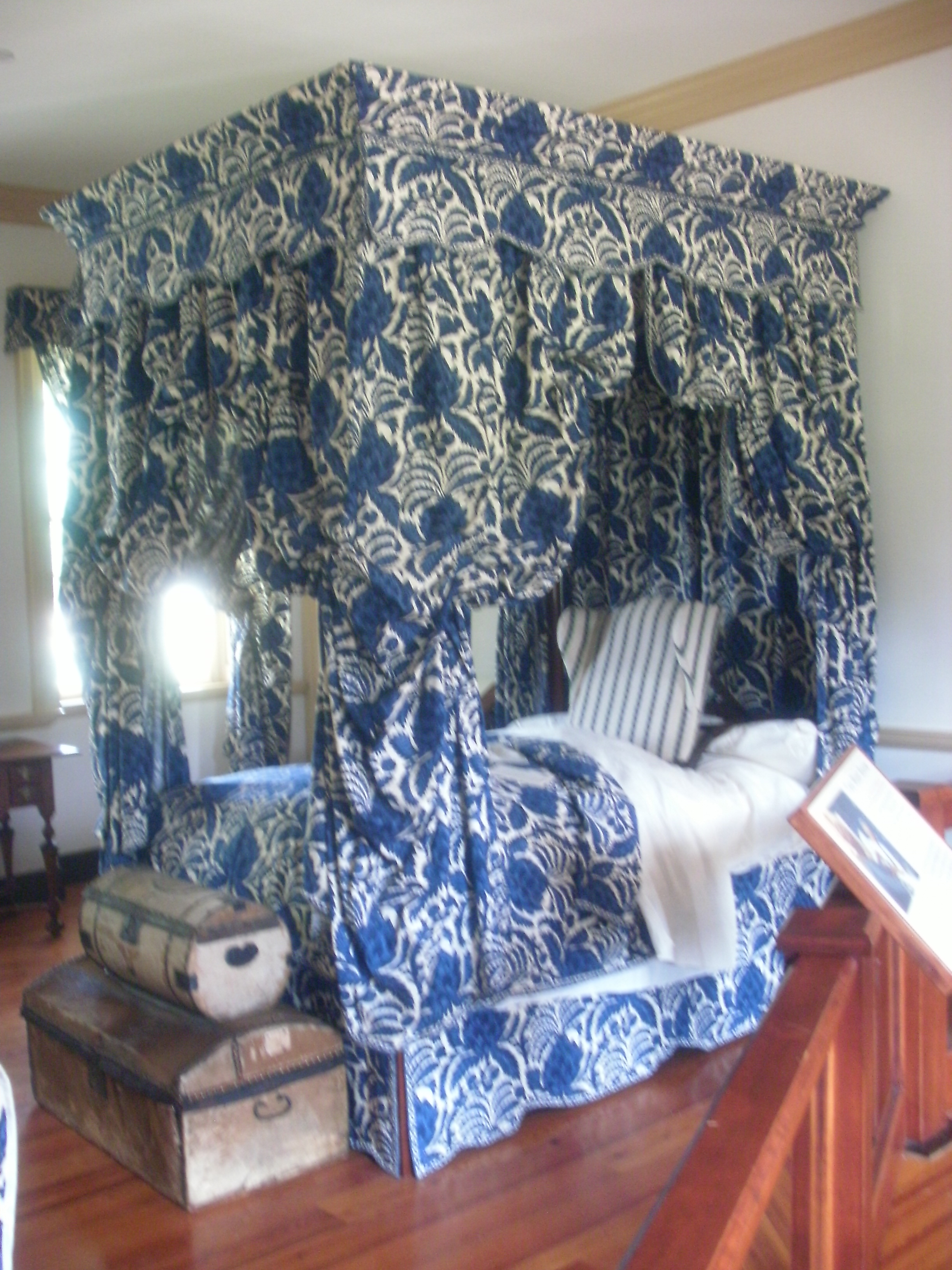
Bed in bedroom, July 2016

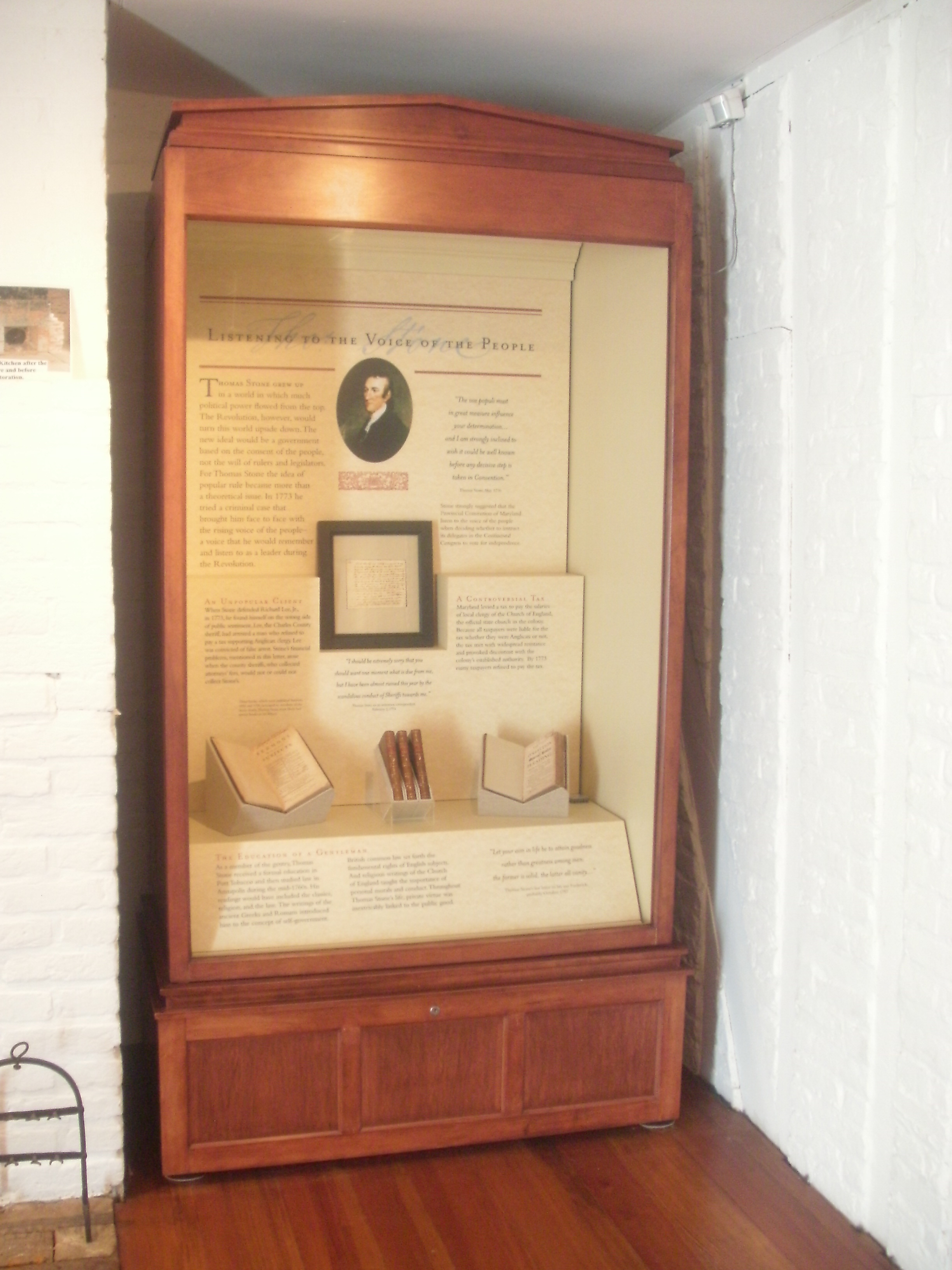
Artifacts relating to the life of Thomas Stone, July 2016

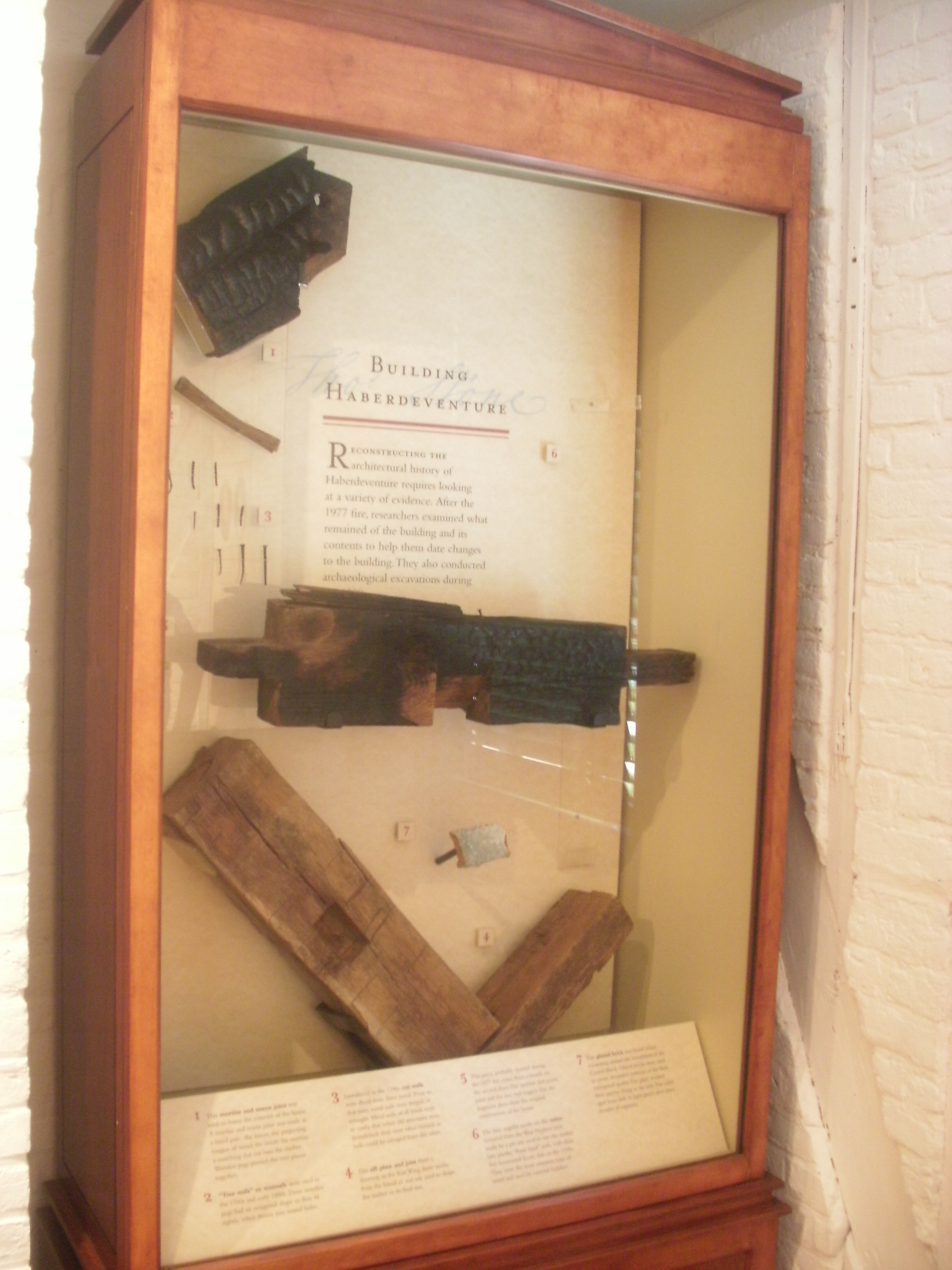
Pieces of the building's original fabric, burned in the 1977 fire, July 2016

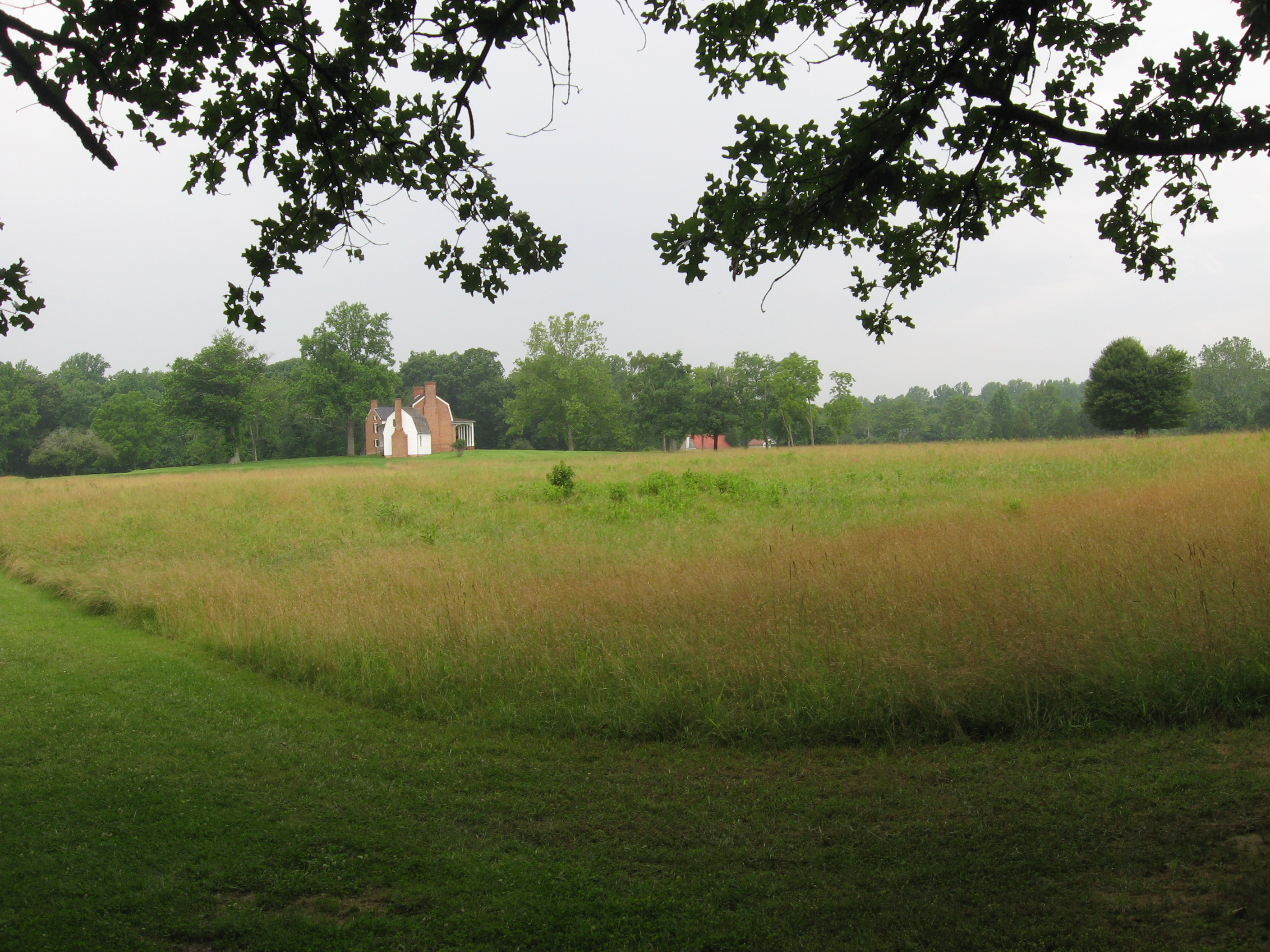
The house and outbuildings, June 2009

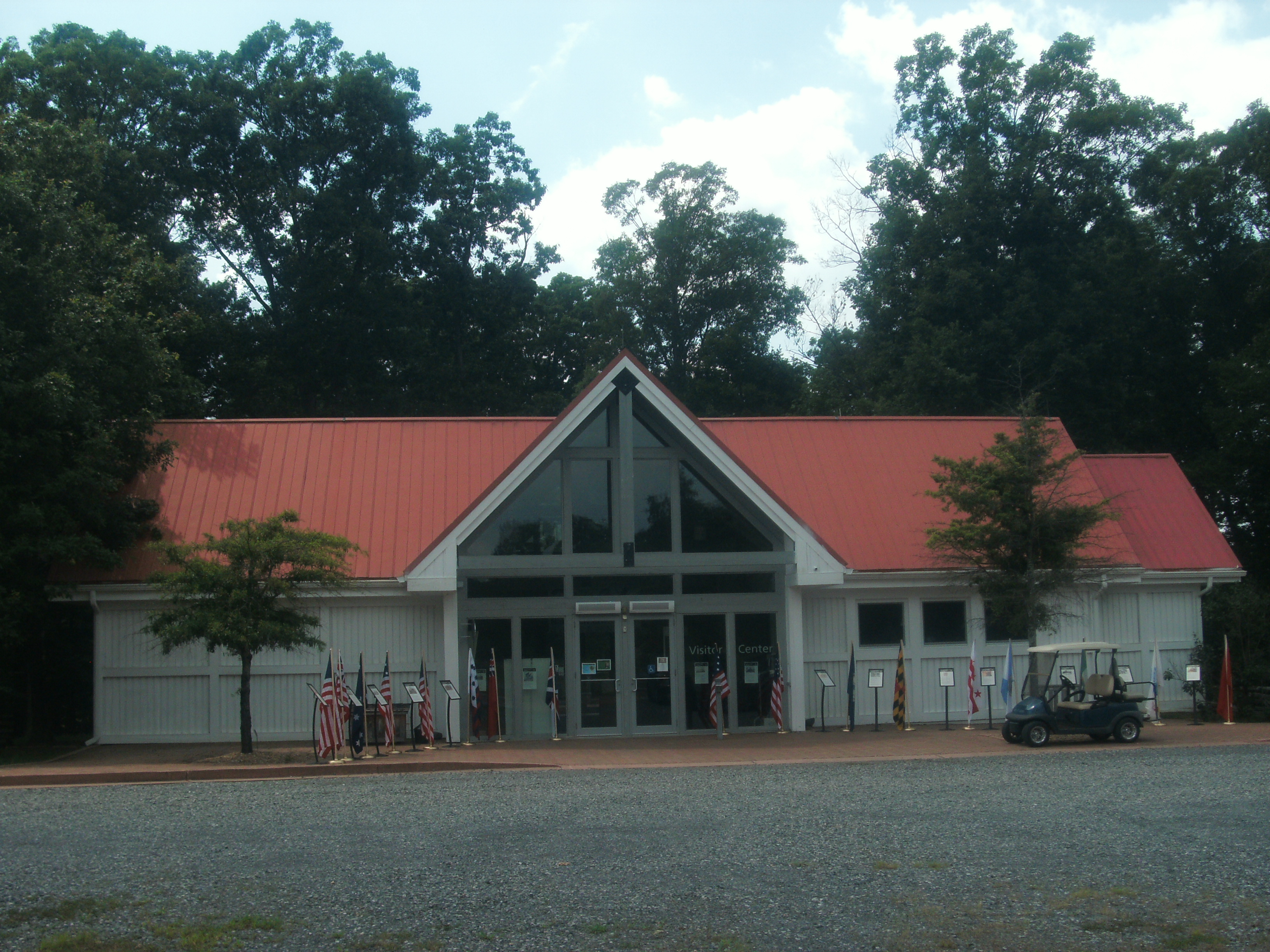
Visitors center, July 2016

== See also ==
- List of National Historic Landmarks in Maryland
- National Register of Historic Places listings in Charles County, Maryland
