= Daniel Jenifer =

American politician

2nd United States Minister to the Austrian Empire
- In office August 27, 1841 – July 7, 1845
- President: John Tyler; James K. Polk
- Preceded by: Henry A. P. Muhlenberg
- Succeeded by: Henry R. Jackson

Member of the U.S. House of Representatives from Maryland's 7th district
- In office March 4, 1835 – March 3, 1841
- Preceded by: Francis Thomas
- Succeeded by: Augustus Rhodes Sollers

Member of the U.S. House of Representatives from Maryland's 1st district
- In office March 4, 1831 – March 3, 1833
- Preceded by: Clement Dorsey
- Succeeded by: Littleton Purnell Dennis

Personal details
- Born: April 15, 1791 Charles County, Maryland
- Died: December 18, 1855 (aged 64) Port Tobacco Village, Maryland
- Party: Anti-Jacksonian, Whig
- Relations: Daniel of St. Thomas Jenifer (uncle); John Campbell (father-in-law)

Daniel Jenifer (April 15, 1791 – December 18, 1855) was an American lawyer and statesman from Charles County, Maryland. He was also the grandnephew of Daniel of St. Thomas Jenifer. He graduated from Charlotte Hall Military Academy. He represented Maryland's 1st Congressional district in the U.S. Congress in 1831–1833 and the 7th district from 1835 to 1841. From 1841 to 1845 he served as U.S. Minister to the Austrian Empire.

His great-uncle, Daniel of St. Thomas Jenifer, was a signer of the United States Constitution. His family home was known as Retreat and is located in Port Tobacco, Maryland.

== Career ==
Daniel Jenifer was born in Charles County, Maryland. He was a grandnephew of Daniel of St. Thomas Jenifer (1723-1790), one of the signers of the U.S. Constitution, and the son-in-law of Congressman John Campbell (1765-1828). He attended public schools and then studied law. In the early 1830s, he began a political career as a member of the short-lived National Republican Party. After the dissolution of his party in the mid-1830s, he became a member of the Whigs.

In the congressional elections of 1830, Jenifer was elected in the first constituency of Maryland in the U.S. House of Representatives in Washington, DC, where he succeeded on 4 March 1831, the successor to Clement Dorsey. Since he was not re-elected in 1832, he was initially only able to complete one term in Congress until March 3, 1833. This was marked by discussions about the policies of President Andrew Jackson. In these years, the Nullification Crisis reached its peak with the state of South Carolina. In 1834, Jenifer was re-elected to Congress in the seventh district of his state, where he was able to complete three more legislative periods between March 4, 1835, and March 3, 1841. There he experienced until 1837 the final phase of the term of President Jackson.

After the end of his time in the US House of Representatives Daniel Jenifer was appointed by President John Tyler as successor to Henry Muhlenberg, the ambassador to Vienna. In this capacity, he served until 1845, at which time he was replaced by the former congressman from Georgia, William Henry Stiles. Between 1845 and 1851, Daniel Jenifer was a notary for wills in Charles County. He died on December 18, 1855, near Port Tobacco Village.

U.S. House of Representatives
Preceded by Clement Dorsey	Member of the U.S. House of Representatives from Maryland's 1st congressional district 1831–1833	Succeeded by Littleton Purnell Dennis
Preceded by Francis Thomas	Member of the U.S. House of Representatives from Maryland's 7th congressional district 1835–1841	Succeeded by Augustus Rhodes Sollers
Diplomatic posts
Preceded by Henry A. P. Muhlenberg	U.S. Minister to the Austrian Empire; 1841–1845	Succeeded by William H. Stiles
