= Sollers =

Sollers is a surname. Notable people with the surname include:

- Philippe Sollers (1936–2023), French writer and critic
- Augustus Rhodes Sollers (1814–1862), American politician

== See also ==
- Sollers JSC, a Russian automotive company
