= 1782 Maryland gubernatorial election =

- November 15, 1782
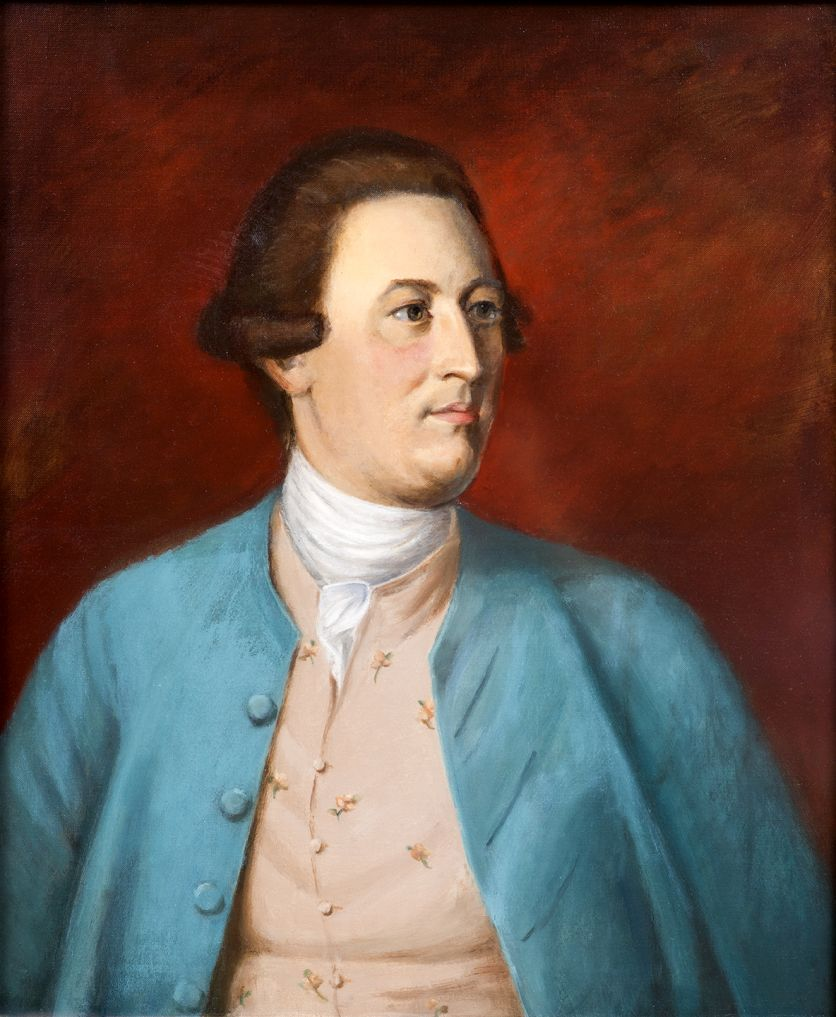

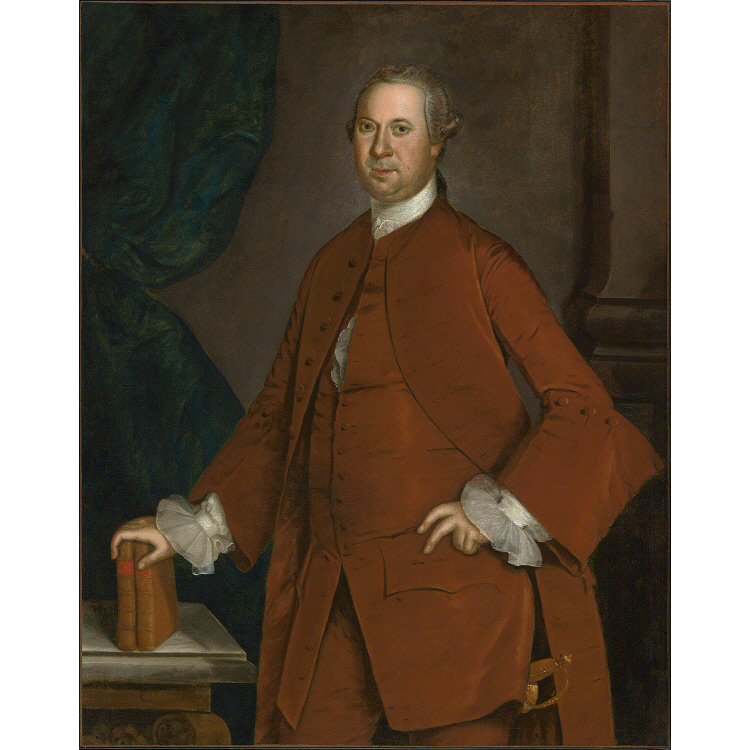
Nominee	William Paca	Daniel of St. Thomas Jenifer
Party	Nonpartisan	Nonpartisan
Popular vote	1	0
Percentage	100.00%	0.00%
Governor before election
Thomas Sim Lee
Nonpartisan
Elected Governor
William Paca
Nonpartisan

The 1782 Maryland gubernatorial election was held on November 15, 1782, in order to elect the Governor of Maryland. Candidate William Paca was elected by the Maryland General Assembly against his opponent, former President of the Maryland Senate Daniel of St. Thomas Jenifer. The exact results of this election are unknown.

== General election ==
On election day, November 15, 1782, William Paca was elected by the Maryland General Assembly. Paca was sworn in as the 3rd Governor of Maryland on November 16, 1782.

=== Results ===
Maryland gubernatorial election, 1782
Party	Candidate	Votes	%
Nonpartisan	William Paca	1	100.00
Nonpartisan	Daniel of St. Thomas Jenifer	0	0.00
Total votes		1	100.00
Nonpartisan hold			
