= 1785 Maryland gubernatorial election =

- November 17, 1785
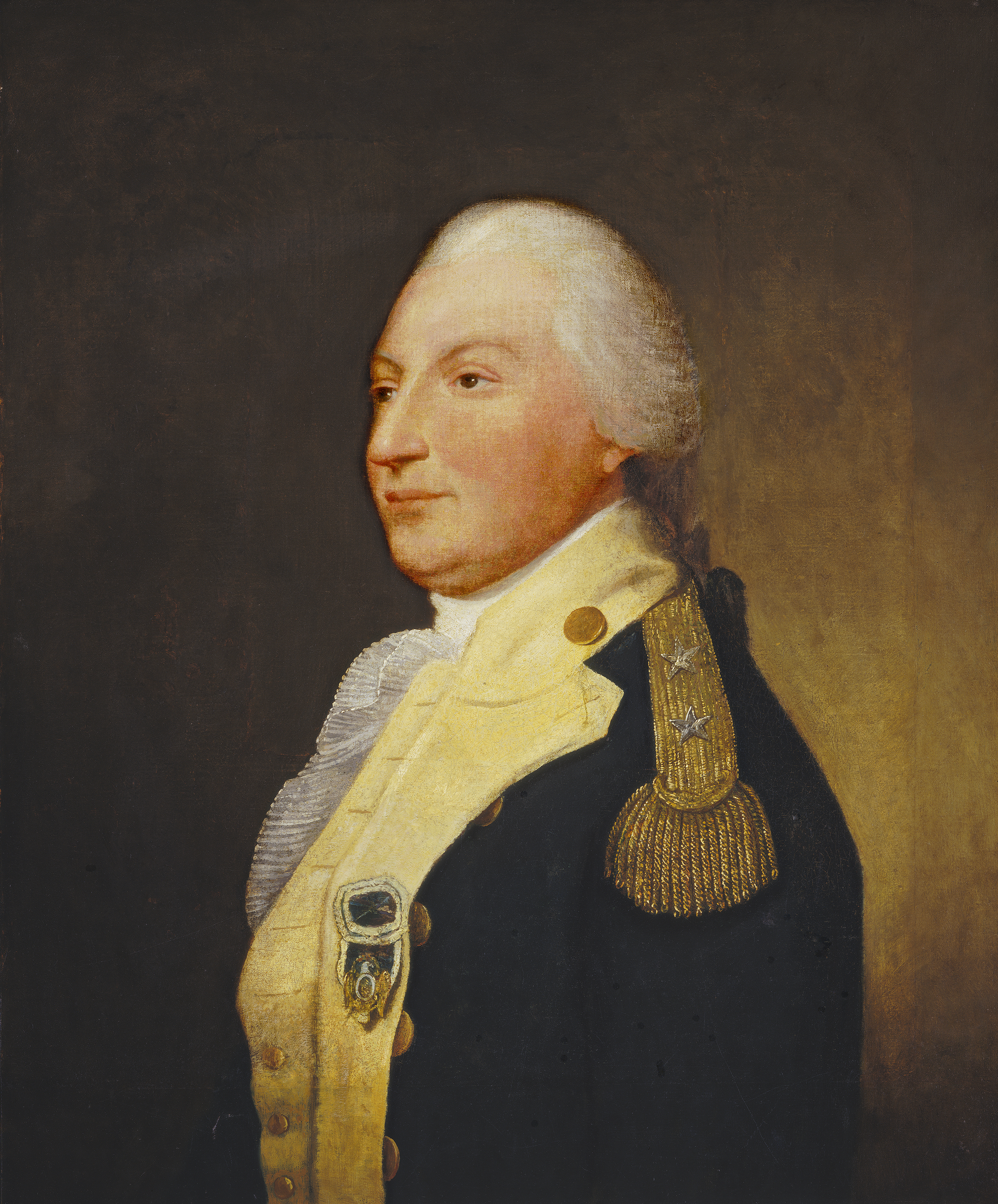

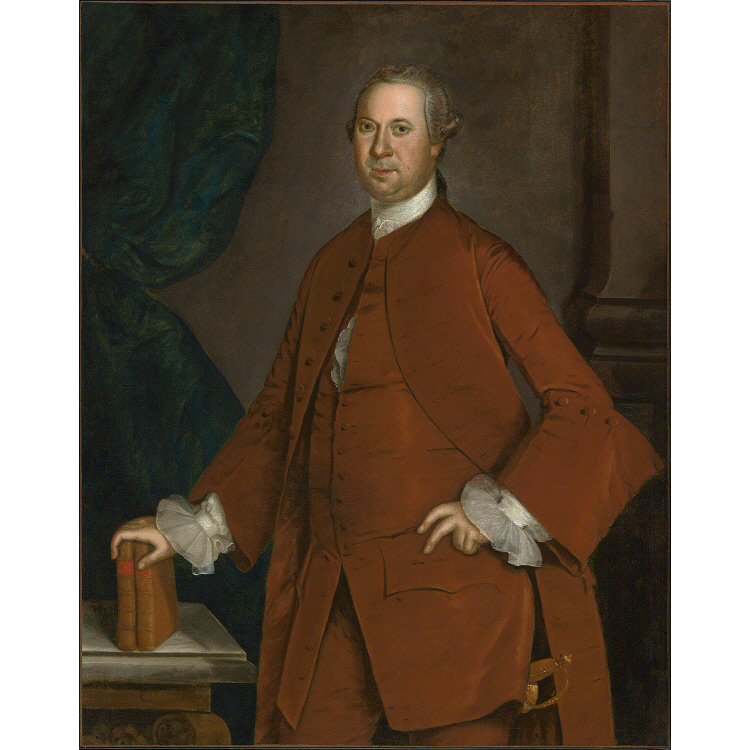
Nominee	William Smallwood	Daniel of St. Thomas Jenifer
Party	Nonpartisan	Nonpartisan
Popular vote	1	0
Percentage	100.00%	0.00%
Governor before election
William Paca
Nonpartisan
Elected Governor
William Smallwood
Nonpartisan

The 1785 Maryland gubernatorial election was held on November 17, 1785, in order to elect the Governor of Maryland. Candidate William Smallwood was elected by the Maryland General Assembly against his opponent, former President of the Maryland Senate Daniel of St. Thomas Jenifer. The exact results of this election are unknown.

== General election ==
On election day, November 17, 1785, William Smallwood was elected by the Maryland General Assembly. Smallwood was sworn in as the 4th Governor of Maryland on November 26, 1785.

=== Results ===
Maryland gubernatorial election, 1785
Party	Candidate	Votes	%
Nonpartisan	William Smallwood	1	100.00
Nonpartisan	Daniel of St. Thomas Jenifer	0	0.00
Total votes		1	100.00
Nonpartisan hold			
