= Clement Dorsey =

American politician (1778–1848)

Member of the U.S. House of Representatives from Maryland's 1st district
- In office March 4, 1825 – March 4, 1831
- Preceded by: Raphael Neale
- Succeeded by: Daniel Jenifer

Personal details
- Born: 1778 Anne Arundel County, Maryland, U.S.
- Died: August 6, 1848 (aged 69–70) Leonardtown, Maryland, U.S.
- Party: National Republican Party

Clement F. Dorsey (1778 – August 6, 1848) was an American politician from Maryland.

He was born near Oaklands in Anne Arundel County, Maryland, in 1778; attended St. John's College, Annapolis, Maryland; studied law; was admitted to the bar and commenced practice. He was a major in the Maryland Militia 1812–1818. He was elected from Maryland's 1st Congressional district to the Nineteenth, Twentieth, and Twenty-first Congresses (March 4, 1825 – March 3, 1831); resumed the practice of law; unsuccessful candidate for election in 1832 to the Twenty-third Congress; judge of the fifth circuit court of Maryland until his death in Leonardtown, St. Mary's County, Maryland, August 6, 1848; interment in a private burial ground at "Summerseat," near Laurel Grove, Maryland.

U.S. House of Representatives
Preceded by Raphael Neale	Member of the U.S. House of Representatives from Maryland's 1st congressional district 1825-1831	Succeeded by Daniel Jenifer
