= Raphael Neale =

American politician

Raphael Neale (died October 19, 1833) was an American politician. Born in St. Mary's County, Maryland, Neale resided in Leonardtown and received a limited education. He was elected as a Federalist to the Sixteenth and Seventeenth Congresses, and reelected as an Adams-Clay Federalist to the Eighteenth Congress, serving from March 4, 1819, to March 3, 1825. He died in Leonardtown.

U.S. House of Representatives
Preceded by Philip Stuart	Member of the U.S. House of Representatives from Maryland's 1st congressional district March 4, 1819 – March 3, 1825	Succeeded by Clement Dorsey
