= Joseph S. Cottman =

American politician

Joseph Stewart Cottman (August 16, 1803 – January 28, 1863) was an American politician.

Born near Allen in Somerset (now Wicomico) County, Maryland, Cottman completed preparatory studies, attended Princeton College in 1821, and Yale College in 1822 and 1823. He studied law, was admitted to the bar in 1826, and commenced practice in Princess Anne, Maryland. He served as a member of the Maryland House of Delegates in 1831, 1832, and again in 1839, and also served in the Maryland State Senate in 1837. He was elected from the sixth district of Maryland as an Independent Whig to the Thirty-second Congress and served from March 4, 1851, to March 3, 1853. He was an unsuccessful candidate for re-election in 1852 to the Thirty-third Congress, and resumed the practice of law while also engaging in agricultural and literary pursuits. He died on his farm Mortherton, near Allen and is interred in St. Andrew's Episcopal Churchyard in Princess Anne.

U.S. House of Representatives
Preceded by John Bozman Kerr	Representative of the 6th Congressional District of Maryland; 1851–1853	Succeeded by Augustus Rhodes Sollers
