= Worlich Westwood =

American politician

Member of the Virginia House of Delegates from Elizabeth City County
- In office December 1798 – January 29, 1803 Serving with George Booker
- Preceded by: Miles King
- Succeeded by: John Stith Westwood
- In office October 18, 1790 – December 19, 1790 Serving with George Booker
- Preceded by: Miles King
- Succeeded by: Miles King
- In office October 17, 1785 – January 21, 1786 Serving with Miles King
- Preceded by: George Wray
- Succeeded by: George Pegram
- In office May 5, 1777 – December 19, 1778 Serving with Miles King
- Preceded by: Wilson Miles Cary; Henry King
- Succeeded by: Thomson Mason; John Tabb

Member of the Virginia House of Burgesses from Elizabeth City County
- In office 1772–1775 Serving with Henry King
- Preceded by: Wilson Miles Cary; James Wallace

Personal details
- Spouse: Hannah King
- Children: At least one
- Relatives: John Stith Westwood (nephew)
- Occupation: Sheriff; politician

Worlich Westwood was an American politician that represented Elizabeth City County in the Virginia House of Burgesses and the Virginia House of Delegates. He was a delegate to the Virginia Federal Convention and voted to ratify the Constitution of the United States.

== Biography ==
Worlich Westwood was the grandson of Worlich Westwood and a son of Mary (née Wallace) and William Westwood, his father had represented Elizabeth City County in the Virginia House of Burgesses from 1736–1740, 1742–1749, and 1752–1758.

Worlich Westwood was one of the more than sixty signers of the announcement to boycott the East India Company, except from saltpetre and spices, alongside George Washington, Thomas Jefferson, Peyton Randolph, and many others.

Westwood was Anglican and a vestryman at St. John's in Elizabeth City Parish, Virginia. Bishop William Meade lists him as "Warlock Westwood" with his brother William in the list of vestrymen from the church in the first volume of Old Churches, Ministers and Families of Virginia.

Westwood was a member of the Virginia House of Burgesses from 1772–1775, and to the Virginia House of Delegates from 1776–1778, 1785–1786, 1790, and 1798–1803. He attended the Virginia Federal Convention in 1788 and voted in favor of the ratification of the Constitution of the United States. He was the sheriff of Elizabeth City County in 1790.

In 1794, Westwood was one of several people that were appointed to be trustees of the town of Hampton, Virginia.

Colonel Worlich Westwood was recommended to the governor of Virginia by Miles King to be appointed as the Superintendent of Quarantine for Hampton, Virginia, in 1805.

Westwood owned the Westwood House on King Street in Hampton, Virginia. After his death, the home was occupied by the British admiral George Cockburn for use as a headquarters during the War of 1812. The home was burnt down during the American Civil War.

== Personal life ==
Worlich Westwood married Hannah King, the daughter of Charles King and Elizabeth Tabb. His sister Elizabeth first married James Wallace and after his death married Thomson Mason. His sister Rachel married Henry King and after his death married Walter McClurg. Worlich Westwood evidently had at least one son, also named Worlich Westwood, who is mentioned as his son in the will of his nephew, Merritt Westwood, the son of his brother James.
