= Chopawamsic (plantation) =

Human settlement in Virginia, United States of America

Coordinates: 38°31′49″N 77°25′25″W

Chopawamsic was an 18th-century plantation on Chopawamsic Creek in Stafford County, Virginia. Chopawamsic was a seat of the Mason family, which enslaved people there.

== History ==
After the death of George Mason I, his eldest son George Mason II sold his father's Accokeek plantation and moved to a property along Chopawamsic Creek that he called Chopawamsic, which means “Isolated Lodge” in Algonquian. Chopawamsic consisted of more than 2,000 acres (810 ha). George Mason II built his manor along Chopawamsic Creek using blocks of local sandstone. Mason planted an orchard and tobacco and raised sheep and cattle, relying on the forced labor of enslaved people. Mason's 1715 will listed 21 named slaves.

Like his father, George Mason III amassed vast land holdings in Stafford, Fauquier, Prince William, and Fairfax counties. Most of his land holdings were leased out as small farms with the rent paid in tobacco. His other sources of income included a fishing business and a ferry service across Occoquan River. A few years after his marriage to Ann Thomson in 1721, Mason moved his family to Charles County, Maryland. Chopawamsic was used as an occasional residence until Mason's death in 1735 when his widow and children, including Founding Father George Mason IV, returned to live there. Ann Thomson Mason chose Chopawamsic as her dower after her husband's death and managed Mason family interests from the estate for the remainder of her life. George Mason IV spent his early adolescence and began his early education at Chopawamsic and resided there until the age of 24 when he moved to present-day Fairfax County. Stevens Thomson Mason, son of Thomson Mason, who was first Attorney of the Bar in Dumfries, was born at Chopawamsic in 1760. Thomson Mason and his family resided at Chopawamsic where most of his children were born and later also at Raspberry Plain in Loudoun County.

The large sandstone manor at Chopawamsic did not survive the American Civil War. In 1942, much of the area along Chopawamsic Creek that once belonged to the Chopawamsic estate was taken over by the United States Department of Defense to create Marine Corps Base Quantico.

== Birthplace ==
The following people were born at Chopawamsic:

- Thomson Mason (14 August 1733–26 February 1785), son of George Mason III and brother of George Mason IV
- Stevens Thomson Mason (29 December 1760–9 May 1803), son of Thomson Mason
- John Thomson Mason (15 March 1765–10 December 1824), son of Thomson Mason
- Ann Thomson Mason Chichester (26 February 1769–29 August 1817), daughter of Thomson Mason
- Westwood Thomson Mason (20 December 1780–1826), daughter of Thomson Mason
