= George Mason III =

American politician (1690–1735)

Member of the Virginia House of Burgesses representing Stafford County
- In office 1715–1726 Serving with George Anderson, George Fitzhugh, William Robinson
- Preceded by: John Waugh
- Succeeded by: John Fitzghugh

Personal details
- Born: George Mason; 1690 Chopawamsic, Stafford County, Colony of Virginia, British America
- Died: March 5, 1735 (aged 44–45) Potomac River, Fairfax County, Colony of Virginia, British America
- Cause of death: drowning
- Spouse: Ann Stevens Thomson (m. 1721)
- Children: George IV; Mary; Thomson
- Parents: George Mason II; Mary Fowke Mason
- Occupation: Planter; politician; militia officer

George Mason III (1690 – March 5, 1735) was a planter, military officer, legislator and government official from the Colony of Virginia. He repeatedly won election to represent Stafford County in the Virginia General Assembly, and was the father of George Mason IV, a Founding Father of the United States.

== Early life ==
Mason was born in 1690 at Chopawamsic plantation in Stafford County, in the Colony of Virginia, in British America. He was the eldest son of George Mason II and his first wife Mary Fowke.

== Planter and politician ==
At the time of his father's death in 1716, Mason was 27 and already a man of prominence in Stafford County. Like his father, Mason increased the family's property and social standing in Stafford County and across the Potomac River in Maryland by strategic marriage as well as continuing the family's traditions of leadership and public service. Like his father, Mason served as a colonel in the Stafford County militia and represented Stafford County as one of its two delegates in the House of Burgesses continually between 1715 and 1726.

During his tenure as a burgess in Williamsburg, Mason met and married his wife Ann Stevens Thomson, whose family owned plantations in Maryland. Like his father and grandfather, this George Mason became Stafford's County Lieutenant of Stafford (in 1719), and also served as the county's sheriff.

Mason amassed enormous land holdings in Stafford, Fauquier, Prince William, and Fairfax counties in Virginia. Mason also increased his land holdings by acquiring large grants south of the Occoquan River, which were later named Woodbridge by his grandson Thomas Mason. Mason leased most of his properties out as smaller farms with their rent paid in tobacco yield. Mason also earned income from fisheries and a ferry service carrying King's Highway across the Occoquan River. Because Mason owned land on both sides of the Occoquan River, he enjoyed a monopoly on river crossings as well as on the fishing rights in Belmont Bay.

In 1716, Mason accompanied the "Knights of the Golden Horseshoe Expedition" led by Lt. Governor Alexander Spotswood across the Blue Ridge and into the Shenandoah Valley, where his famous son would invest.

== Marriage and children ==
Mason married Ann Stevens Thomson, daughter of Stevens Thomson and his wife Dorothea, in 1721. The couple had three children:

- George Mason IV (11 December 1725–7 October 1792)
- Mary Thomson Mason Selden (1731–5 January 1758)
- Thomson Mason (14 August 1733–26 February 1785)

A few years after his marriage to Ann, Mason moved his family to Stump Neck plantation in Charles County, Maryland, relegating the Chopawamsic estate in Stafford County, Virginia, to a secondary residence.

== Death ==
Mason drowned when a storm capsized his boat while crossing the Potomac River between plantations on March 5, 1735. Soon after his death, Mason's widow and children returned to Chopawamsic. At the time of his drowning, Mason owned 20,875 acres (84.48 km^{2}) in Stafford County alone.
