= Retreat (Port Tobacco, Maryland) =

Historic house in Maryland, United States

- U.S. National Register of Historic Places
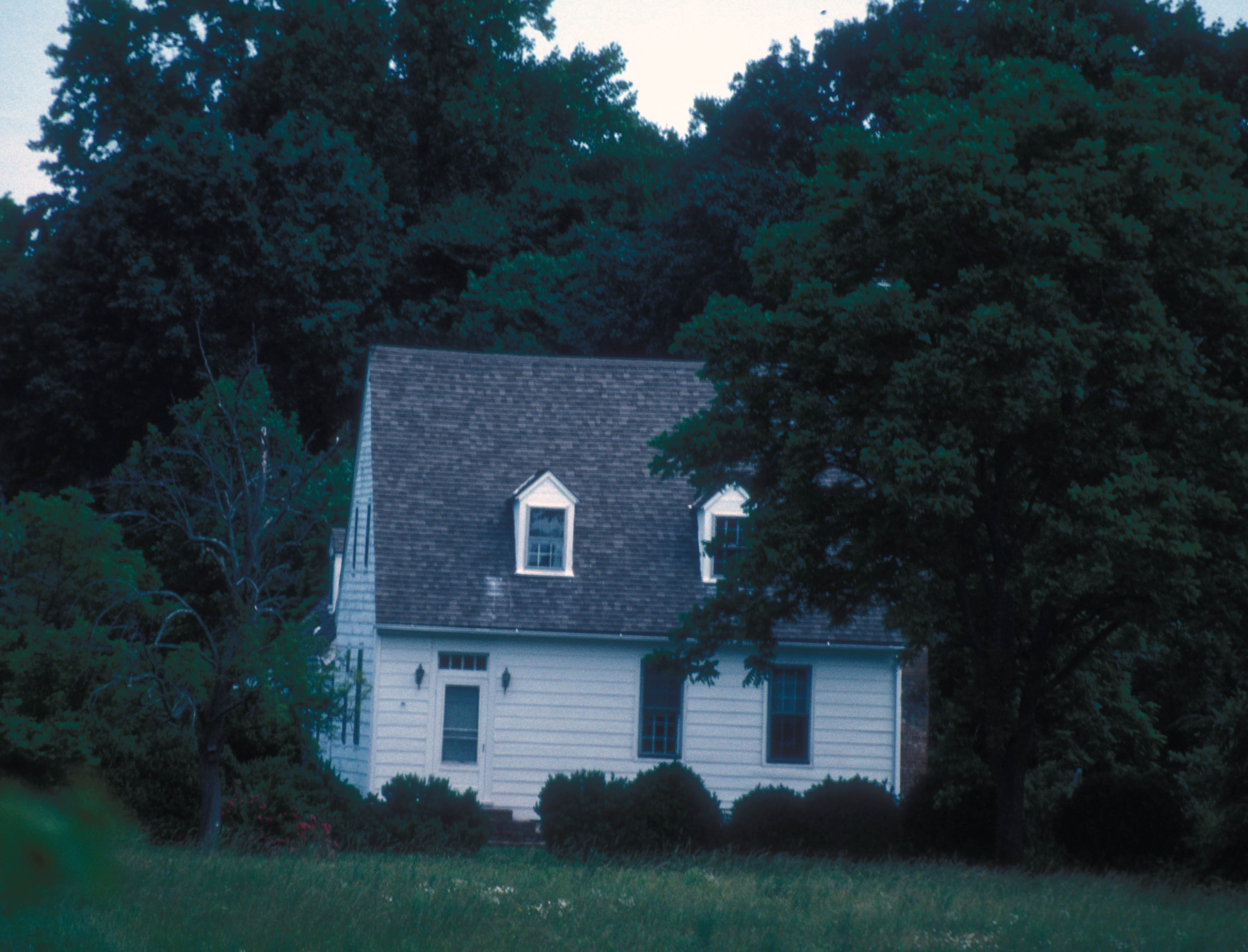

- Location within Maryland Location within the United States
- Location: Maryland Route 484/Poor House Rd. and Maryland Route 6, Port Tobacco, Maryland
- Coordinates: 38°30′38″N 77°2′48″W
- Area: 30 acres (12 ha)
- Built: 1770
- Architectural style: Colonial
- NRHP reference No.: 88000222
- Added to NRHP: June 28, 1988

Retreat is a historic home located at Port Tobacco, Charles County, Maryland, United States. It is a one-story, clapboard-sheathed, frame house with a double chimney. The principal part of the house was built about 1770. Also located on the property is a frame, pyramid-roofed meathouse, dating from the early 19th century, and moved here from another historic property in the county known as "Brentland" in 1953. The home, approached by a private gravel road, is surrounded by cultivated fields, meadows, and woodland, preserving its original agricultural and rural setting. The house is one of the earliest known examples of the side-passage, two-room dwelling in Charles County. It is associated with Daniel of St. Thomas Jenifer and Daniel Jenifer.

Retreat was listed on the National Register of Historic Places in 1988.
