= Ellerslie (Port Tobacco, Maryland) =

Historic house in Maryland, United States

- U.S. National Register of Historic Places
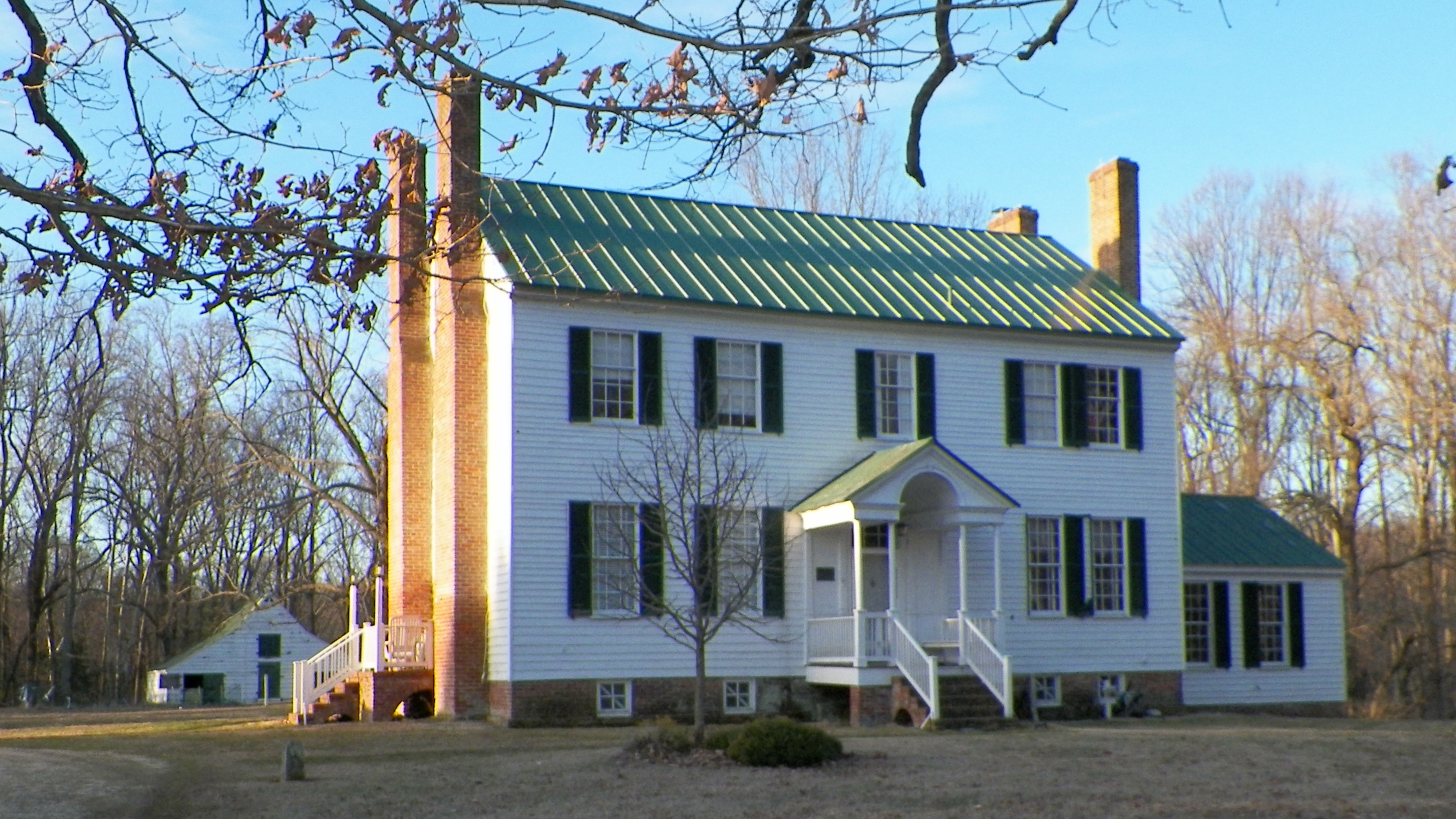

- Location within Maryland Location within the United States
- Nearest city: Port Tobacco, Maryland
- Coordinates: 38°30′20″N 77°2′29″W
- Architectural style: Georgian
- NRHP reference No.: 79003264
- Added to NRHP: September 24, 1979

Ellerslie is a historic home located at Port Tobacco, Charles County, Maryland, United States. It is a two-story frame house of basic Georgian styling, with two exterior chimneys at each end housing nine fireplaces, including a large, original kitchen fireplace, in the "old kitchen" recreated over the original kitchen's foundation. Ellerslie was originally built in the mid 18th century, and was extensively altered and enlarged about 1790–1820. The home was extensively restored by Watson and Velva Perrygo in the 1960s. A porch was added in 1965, and some period outbuildings were restored and added to the property through the mid 1970s. The property also houses what is likely the oldest barn in the country, which was dismantled and moved from its original "Friendship" farm site in Nanjemoy, Maryland, in the early 1970s and reconstructed on the property.

As one enters the front door of the barn and looks up at the long overhead beam stretching the length of the barn to your left, it is possible to make out large lettering that reads "T Dent 1667". The original home from the Friendship property was also moved and reconstructed, under the supervision of Watson Perrygo, on the College of Southern Maryland campus in La Plata. Friendship House, which dates from the late 1600s, is open to the public. Ellerslie is the birthplace of Daniel of St. Thomas Jenifer, a Founding Father of the United States and signer of the United States Constitution.

Ellerslie was listed on the National Register of Historic Places in 1979.
