= Philip Stuart =

American politician (1760–1830)

Member of the U.S. House of Representatives from Maryland's 1st district
- In office March 4, 1811 – March 3, 1819
- Preceded by: John Campbell
- Succeeded by: Raphael Neale

Personal details
- Born: 1760 Fredericksburg, Virginia Colony, British America
- Died: August 14, 1830 (aged 69–70) Washington, D.C., U.S.
- Resting place: Congressional Cemetery; Washington, D.C.
- Party: Federalist

Military service
- Allegiance: United States
- Branch/service: Continental Army
- Rank: Lieutenant
- Unit: 3rd Continental Light Dragoons; Second Artillerists and Engineers
- Battles/wars: American Revolutionary War; Battle of Eutaw Springs; War of 1812

Philip Stuart (1760 – August 14, 1830) was an American politician and soldier who represented the state of Maryland in the House of Representatives.

== Early life ==
Philip Stuart was born near Fredericksburg in the Virginia Colony, and completed his preparatory education before moving to Maryland.

== Career ==
Stuart served during the American Revolutionary War as a lieutenant in the 3rd Continental Light Dragoons, and was wounded at Eutaw Springs on September 8, 1781. He transferred to Baylor's dragoons on November 9, 1782, and later served as a lieutenant in the Second Artillerists and Engineers, beginning on June 5, 1798, and ending with his resignation on November 15, 1800. He also served in the War of 1812.

Stuart was elected as a Federalist to the 12th U.S. Congress and to the three succeeding Congresses, serving from March 4, 1811, to March 3, 1819.

== Personal life ==
Stuart had a rowhouse at Wheat Row in Washington, D.C.

Stuart died in Washington, D.C., and is interred in the Congressional Cemetery.

U.S. House of Representatives
| Preceded by John Campbell | Member of the U.S. House of Representatives from Maryland's 1st congressional district March 4, 1811 – March 3, 1819 | Succeeded by Raphael Neale |
