= Daniel of St. Thomas Jenifer =

American Founding Father and politician

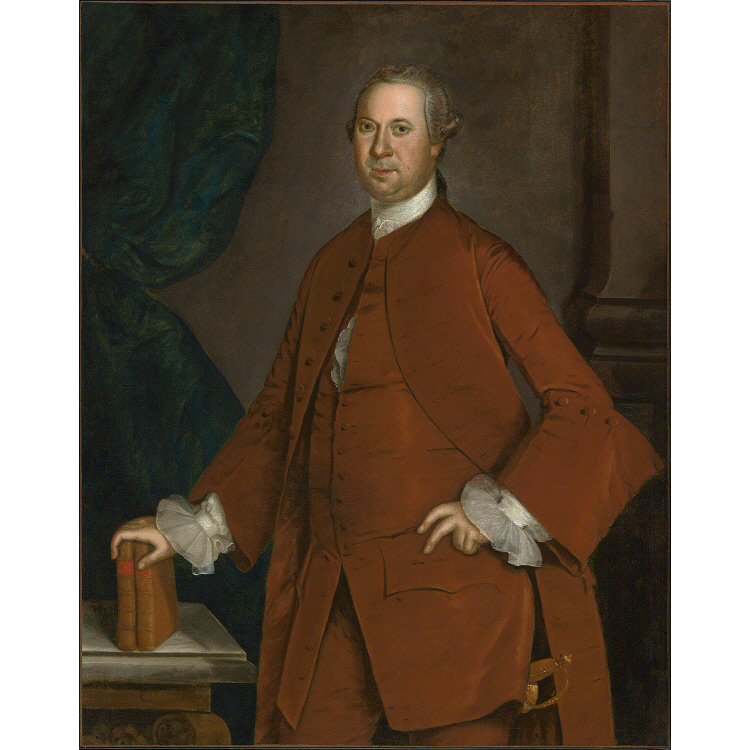
- Daniel of St. Thomas Jenifer painted by John Hesselius, c. 1760–70

1st President of the Maryland State Senate
- In office 1777–1780
- Succeeded by: Matthew Tilghman

Personal details
- Born: 1723 Port Tobacco, Maryland, British America
- Died: November 16, 1790 (aged 66–67) Annapolis, Maryland, U.S.

Daniel of St. Thomas Jenifer (Note: Daniel of St. Thomas Jenifer's surname is Jenifer (pronounced "Jennifer"). According to Bro. C. Edward Quinn in Roots of the Republic: The Signers of the Constitution of the United States (Danbury, CT: Grolier Educational, 1996, p. 70), the origin of Jenifer's unusual hagionymic given name (presumably referring to Thomas the Apostle) is unknown, but it appears frequently in his family. His ancestors included great-grandfather Captain Daniel Jenifer (1637–1692/3) who was a loyalist sheriff in Accomack County, Virginia, during Bacon's Rebellion and who later moved to the Eastern Shore of Maryland, grandfather Daniel of St. Thomas Jenifer (1672–1730), and father, Dr. Daniel Jenifer (c. 1699–1729). Daniel of St. Thomas Jenifer had a brother named Daniel Jenifer (1727–1795) who himself had two sons, one named Daniel of St. Thomas who died unmarried and one Dr. Daniel Jenifer (1756–1809). Dr. Daniel Jenifer in turn had sons named Daniel of St. Thomas (1789–1822) and Col. Daniel Jenifer (1791–1855; congressman and ambassador). This Daniel Jenifer also had a son named Daniel and one named Daniel of St. Thomas (1814–1843).) (1723 – November 16, 1790) was an American politician and Founding Father who was one of the signers of the Constitution of the United States. He was active for many years in the Province of Maryland's colonial government, but when conflict arose with Great Britain, Jenifer embraced the Patriot cause.

== Early life and colonial career ==
Jenifer, born at Coates Retirement (now Ellerslie), an estate west of Port Tobacco in Charles County, Maryland, was the son of Dr. Daniel Jenifer and Elizabeth Mason. As a young man, he acted as a receiver general, the local financial agent for the last two proprietors of Maryland. He was the uncle of Thomas Stone, Michael J. Stone, and John Hoskins Stone. The Jenifer family was of Swedish origin.

Jenifer served as justice of the peace for Charles carver county and later for the western circuit of Maryland. He sat on a commission that settled a boundary dispute between Pennsylvania and Delaware (1760) and on the Governor's Council, the upper house of the Maryland legislature that also served as the colony's court of appeals and as a board of senior advisers to the governor (1773–76).

== American Revolution ==
Despite his close ties with the colonial government, Jenifer strongly resented what he and most of the colonial gentry saw as Parliament's arbitrary interference with the colonies' affairs, especially its laws concerning taxation and trade regulation. Years before the struggle for independence began, he had defended the proprietors of Maryland against those who sought to make Maryland a Royal colony. When the Revolution came, Jenifer lent his considerable support as a wealthy landowner to the Patriot cause, despite the fact that many leading Patriots had been his enemies in the proprietorship struggle. Jenifer became the president of Maryland's Council of Safety, the Patriot body established to organize Maryland's military forces for the Revolution (1775–1777). When, in 1776, a new constitution was framed for the state of Maryland, Jenifer commented on the document's neglect of popular sovereignty: "The Senate does not appear to me to be a Child of the people at Large, and therefore will not be Supported by them longer than there Subsists the most perfect Union between the different Legislative branches."

During and after the war, Jenifer became increasingly concerned about national affairs. He represented his state in the Continental Congress (1778–1782) while simultaneously serving as president of Maryland's first senate (1777–1780). As manager of his state's finances between 1782 and 1785, Jenifer drew on his experiences as a landholder to help the state survive the critical postwar economic depression. Along with James Madison, John Dickinson, George Mason and his good friend George Washington, Jenifer began to explore ways to solve the economic and political problems that had arisen under the weak Articles of Confederation. Consequently, he attended the Mount Vernon Conference, a meeting that led eventually to the Constitutional Convention.

== Constitutional Convention ==
Like his old friend Benjamin Franklin, Jenifer enjoyed the status of elder statesman at the Convention, which took place from May 25 to September 17, 1787, in Philadelphia, Pennsylvania. Jenifer used his prestige (as well as humor and reputation as pleasant company) to work for a strong and permanent union of the states by reconciling opposing views and formulating the compromises that made the convention a success.

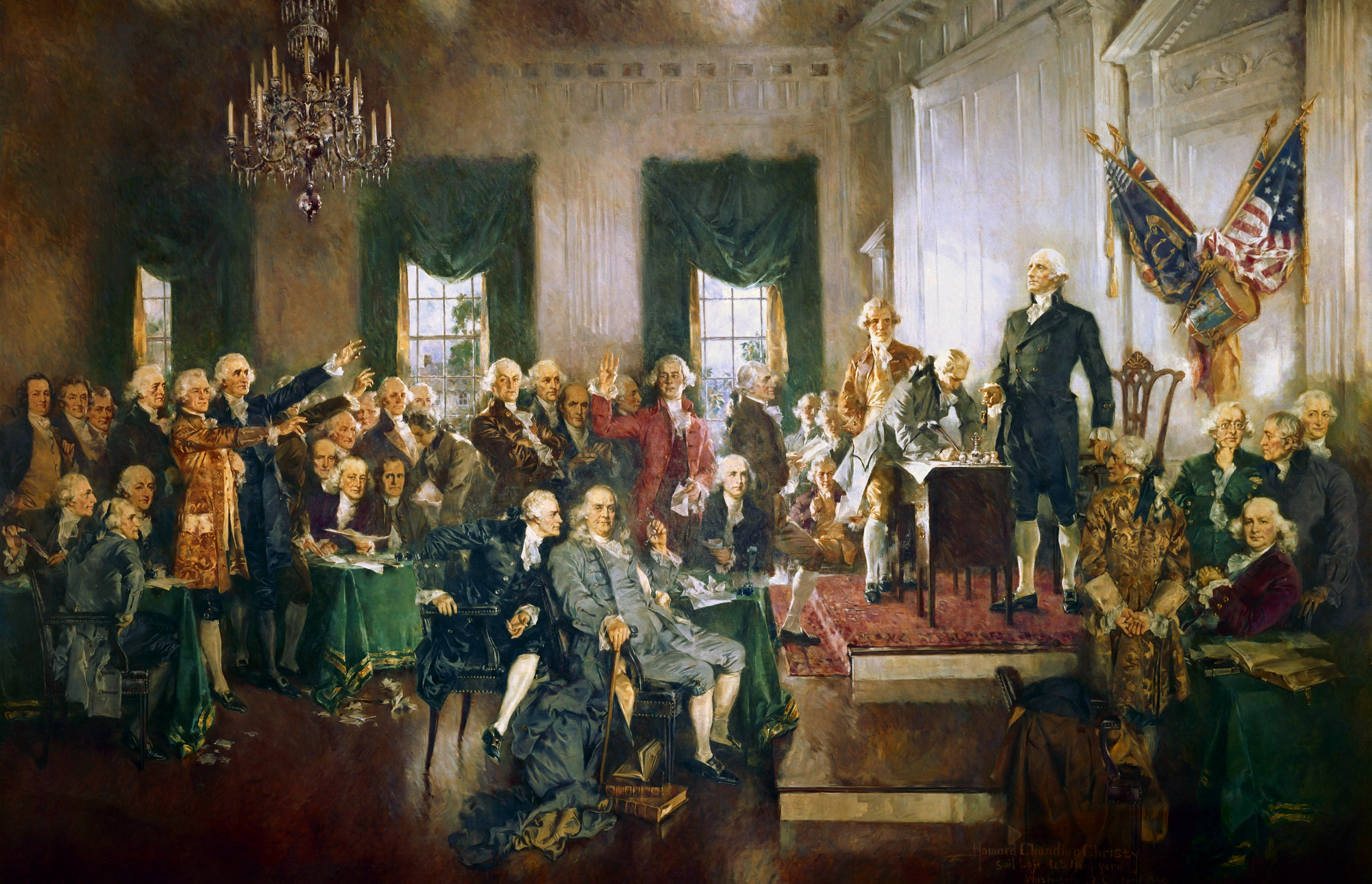
Scene at the Signing of the Constitution of the United States

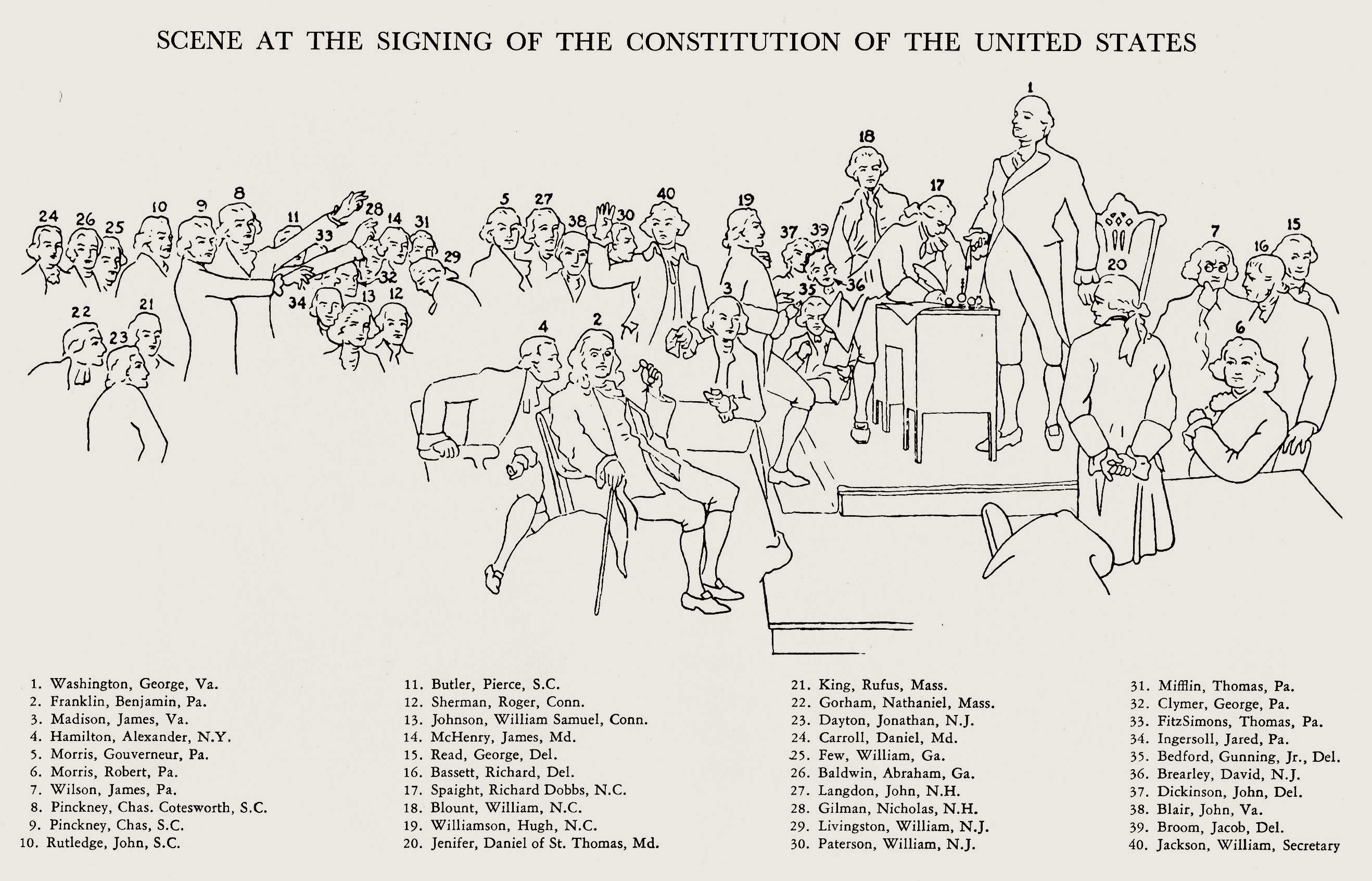
Daniel of St. Thomas Jenifer, No. 20.

Jenifer took stands on several important issues, although his advanced age restricted his activity in the day-to-day proceedings. Business experience gained while managing a large plantation had convinced him that an active central government was needed to ensure financial and commercial stability. To that end, Jenifer favored a strong and permanent union of the states in which a Congress representing the people had the power to tax. Concerned with continuity in the new government, he favored a three-year term for the United States House of Representatives. Too frequent elections, he concluded, might lead to indifference and would make prominent men unwilling to seek office. Jenifer was outvoted on this point, but his reaction was to marvel at the delegates' ability to come to agreement on a plan of government: "The first month we only came to grips, and the second it seemed as though we would fly apart forever, however we came as close as friends of eighty years in but days." When Maryland's other delegate, Luther Martin, said that he feared being hanged if the people of Maryland approved the Constitution, Jenifer quipped that Martin should stay in Philadelphia, so that he would not hang in his home state.

== Death and legacy ==
After the convention, Jenifer retired to his plantation at Stepney near Annapolis, where he died in 1790. He was buried at Ellerslie, the place of his birth, which is now on the National Register of Historic Places. In his will, Jenifer passed his roughly 16,000-acre (65 km^{2}) land holdings to his nephew, Daniel Jenifer, and instructed that all his slaves be freed six years after his death. The following year the younger Jenifer had a son, who was named after his great-uncle. Daniel Jenifer, like his uncle, also served as magistrate in Charles County, as well as three terms in the U.S. House of Representatives. His family home, Retreat, was located in Charles County, near one of the largest slave-trading ports of the era, Port Tobacco; it was built in the last quarter of the 18th century and is listed on the National Register of Historic Places.

Jenifer appears in John Trumbull's 1824 painting General George Washington Resigning His Commission, which was featured on the reverse of the United States five-thousand-dollar bill.

Jenifer Street in Madison, Wisconsin, is named in honor of Jenifer. There is also a Jenifer Street in Washington, D.C. Daniel of Saint Thomas Jenifer Elementary school in Charles County was named in his honor. Jenifer Elementary School is located in the Charles County Public Schools school district.

== Notes ==
Political offices
Preceded by no one	President of the Maryland State Senate; 1777–1780	Succeeded by Matthew Tilghman
Preceded by Matthew Tilghman	President of the Maryland State Senate; 1780	Succeeded by George Plater
