= George Mason =

American Founding Father (1725–1792)

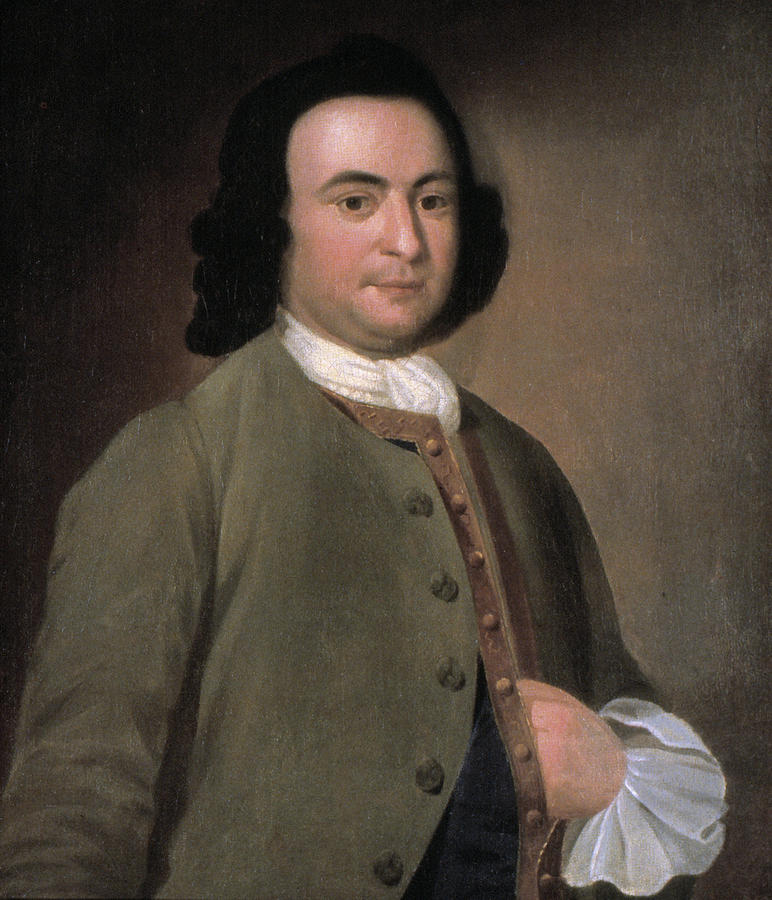
- Portrait, c. 1750

Member of the Virginia House of Delegates representing Fairfax County
- In office October 17, 1786 – June 22, 1788 Serving with David Stuart
- Preceded by: Charles Simms
- Succeeded by: Roger West
- In office October 7, 1776 – May 6, 1781 Serving with John West Jr., Philip Alexander, John Parke Custis
- Preceded by: None (independence)
- Succeeded by: Benjamin Dulaney

Member of the Virginia House of Burgesses representing Fairfax County
- In office 1758–1761 Serving with George Johnson
- Preceded by: George William Fairfax
- Succeeded by: John West

Personal details
- Born: December 11, 1725 Fairfax County, Virginia, British America
- Died: October 7, 1792 (aged 66) Gunston Hall, Fairfax County, Virginia, U.S.
- Resting place: Mason Family Cemetery, Lorton, Virginia, U.S. 38.6686°N 77.1682°W
- Spouses: Ann Eilbeck (m. 1750; died 1773); Sarah Brent (m. 1780)
- Children: George; Ann; William; Thomson; Sarah; Mary; John; Elizabeth; Thomas; James; Richard
- Parents: George Mason III; Ann Stevens Thomson
- Occupation: Landowner
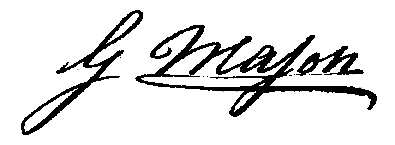
- Signature

George Mason (December 11, 1725 [O.S. November 30, 1725] – October 7, 1792) was an American planter, politician, Founding Father, and delegate to the U.S. Constitutional Convention in Philadelphia in 1787, one of three delegates who refused to sign the Constitution. His writings, including substantial portions of the Fairfax Resolves of 1774, the Virginia Declaration of Rights of 1776, and his Objections to this Constitution of Government (1787) opposing ratification, have exercised a significant influence on American political thought and events. The Virginia Declaration of Rights, which Mason principally authored, served as a basis for the United States Bill of Rights, of which he has been deemed a father.

Mason was born in 1725 in present-day Fairfax County, Virginia. His father drowned while crossing the Potomac River in 1735 when Mason was nine years old. His mother managed the family estates until he came of age. Mason married in 1750, built Gunston Hall, and lived the life of a country squire, supervising his lands, family, and slaves. He briefly served in the House of Burgesses and involved himself in community affairs, sometimes serving with his neighbor George Washington. As tensions grew between Great Britain and the North American colonies, Mason came to support the colonial side, using his knowledge and experience to help the revolutionary cause, finding ways to work around the Stamp Act 1765 and serving in the pro-independence Fourth Virginia Convention in 1775 and the Fifth Virginia Convention in 1776.

Mason prepared the first draft of the Virginia Declaration of Rights in 1776, and his words formed much of the text adopted by the final Revolutionary Virginia Convention. He also wrote a constitution for the state; Thomas Jefferson and others sought to have the convention adopt their ideas, but Mason's version was nonetheless adopted. During the American Revolutionary War, Mason was a member of the powerful House of Delegates of the Virginia General Assembly, but to the irritation of Washington and others, he refused to serve in the Second Continental Congress in Philadelphia, citing health and family commitments.

In 1787, Mason was named one of his state's delegates to the Constitutional Convention in Philadelphia, his only lengthy trip outside Virginia. Many clauses in the Constitution were influenced by Mason's input, but he ultimately did not sign the final version, citing the lack of a bill of rights among his most prominent objections. He also wanted an immediate end to the slave trade and a supermajority requirement for navigation acts, fearing that restrictions on shipping might harm Virginia. He failed to attain these objectives in Philadelphia and later at the Virginia Ratifying Convention of 1788. His prominent fight for a bill of rights led fellow Virginian James Madison to introduce one during the First Congress in 1789; these amendments were ratified in 1791, a year before Mason died. Obscure after his death, Mason later came to be recognized in the 20th and 21st centuries for his contributions to Virginia and the early United States.

== Early life and education ==
George Mason's coat of arms

Mason was born in present-day Fairfax County, in the Colony of Virginia, in British America, on December 11, 1725. Mason's parents owned property in Dogue's Neck (now Mason Neck), Virginia, and a second property across the Potomac River in Charles County, Maryland, which had been inherited by his mother.

Mason's great-grandfather George Mason I was a Cavalier who was born in 1629 in Pershore, Worcestershire, England. Militarily defeated in the English Civil War, Mason and other Cavaliers emigrated to the American colonies in the 1640s and 1650s. Mason I settled in present-day Stafford County, Virginia, where he was awarded land as a reward for bringing his family and servants to the Colony of Virginia, under headright, which awarded 50 acres for each person transported into the Colony. His son, George Mason II (1660–1716), was the first to move to what in 1742 became Fairfax County, then at the frontier between English and Native American controlled areas. George Mason III (1690–1735) like his father and grandfather served in the House of Burgesses and also as county lieutenant. George Mason IV's mother, Ann Thomson Mason, was the daughter of a former Attorney General of Virginia who immigrated from England. A few years after his marriage to Ann, George Mason III moved his family to Stump Neck plantation in Charles County, relegating the Chopawamsic estate in Stafford County, Virginia, to a secondary residence.

Colonial Virginia at the time had few roads, and boats carried most commerce on Chesapeake Bay or its tributaries, including the Potomac and Rappahannock rivers. Most settlement took place near the rivers, through which planters could trade with the world. Colonial Virginia initially had few towns, since estates were largely self-sufficient and could obtain what they needed without the need to purchase locally. Even the capital, Williamsburg, had limited economic activity when the legislature was not in session. Local politics was dominated by large landowners, including the Masons. The Virginia economy rose and fell with tobacco, the main crop, which was raised primarily for export to Great Britain.

On March 5, 1735, when his son was only nine years old, George Mason III drowned when a storm capsized his boat while crossing the Potomac River between plantations. Soon after his death, his widow and children returned to Chopawamsic. At the time of his drowning, he owned 20,875 acres (84.48 km^{2}) in Stafford County alone.

In 1736, George Mason IV began his education with a Mr. Williams, who was hired to teach Mason for the price of 1,000 pounds (450 kg) of tobacco per annum. His studies began at his mother's house. But the following year, he boarded with a Mrs. Simpson in Maryland, and Williams continued as his teacher through 1739. By 1740, Mason was back at Chopawamsic, under the tutelage of a Dr. Bridges, likely Charles Bridges, who helped develop the British schools run by the Society for the Promotion of Christian Knowledge, and arrived in British America in 1731. Mason and his brother Thomson likely utilized John Francis Mercer's library, one of the largest in Virginia at the time. Conversations with Mercer and book-lovers who gathered around him could have continued his education informally.

== Career ==
=== Fairfax County ===
The obligations and offices that came with being one of the largest local landowners descended on Mason as they had previously on his father and grandfather. In 1747, Mason was named to the Court of Fairfax County, Virginia, and was elected as a vestryman at Truro Parish, where he served between 1749 and 1785. He took a position among the officers of the Fairfax County militia, eventually rising to the rank of colonel.

The county court heard civil and criminal cases, and also decided matters such as local taxes. Membership fell to most major landowners. Mason was a justice for much of the rest of his life, though he was excluded because of nonattendance at court from 1752 to 1764, and he resigned in 1789 when continued service meant swearing to uphold a constitution he could not support. Even while a member, he often did not attend. Joseph Horrell, in a journal article on Mason's court service, noted that he was often in poor health and lived the furthest of any of the major estateholders from the Fairfax County courthouse, whether at its original site near today's Tyson's Corner or later in newly founded Alexandria. Robert Rutland, editor of Mason's papers, considered court service a major influence on Mason's later thinking and writing, but Horrell denied it, writing that "if the Fairfax court provided a course for Mason's early training, he chiefly distinguished himself by skipping classes."

Alexandria was one of the towns founded or given corporate status in the mid-18th century in which Mason had interests; he purchased three of the original lots along King and Royal Streets and became a municipal trustee in 1754. He also served as a trustee of Dumfries, in Prince William County, and had business interests there and in Georgetown, on the Maryland side of the Potomac River in present-day Washington, D.C.

In 1748, he sought a seat in the House of Burgesses; the process was controlled by more senior members of the court and he was not then successful, but he later emerged victorious in 1758.

=== Gunston Hall ===
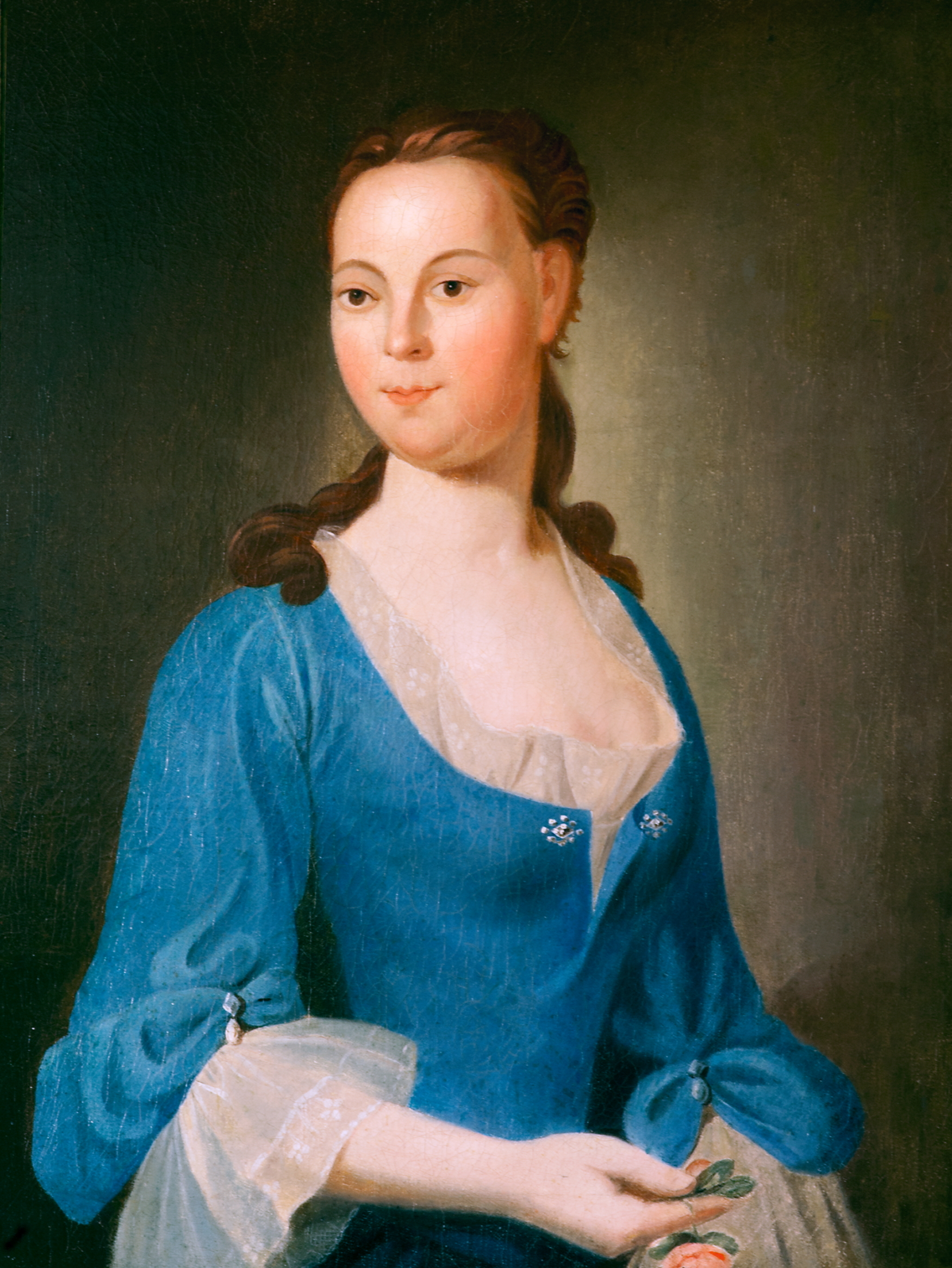
Portrait of Mason's wife, Ann Eilbeck, with whom he had nine children. By Dominic Boudet in 1811, a copy of the destroyed original by John Hesselius.

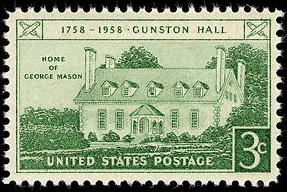
A 1958 postage stamp featuring Gunston Hall, Mason's residence in Fairfax County, Virginia

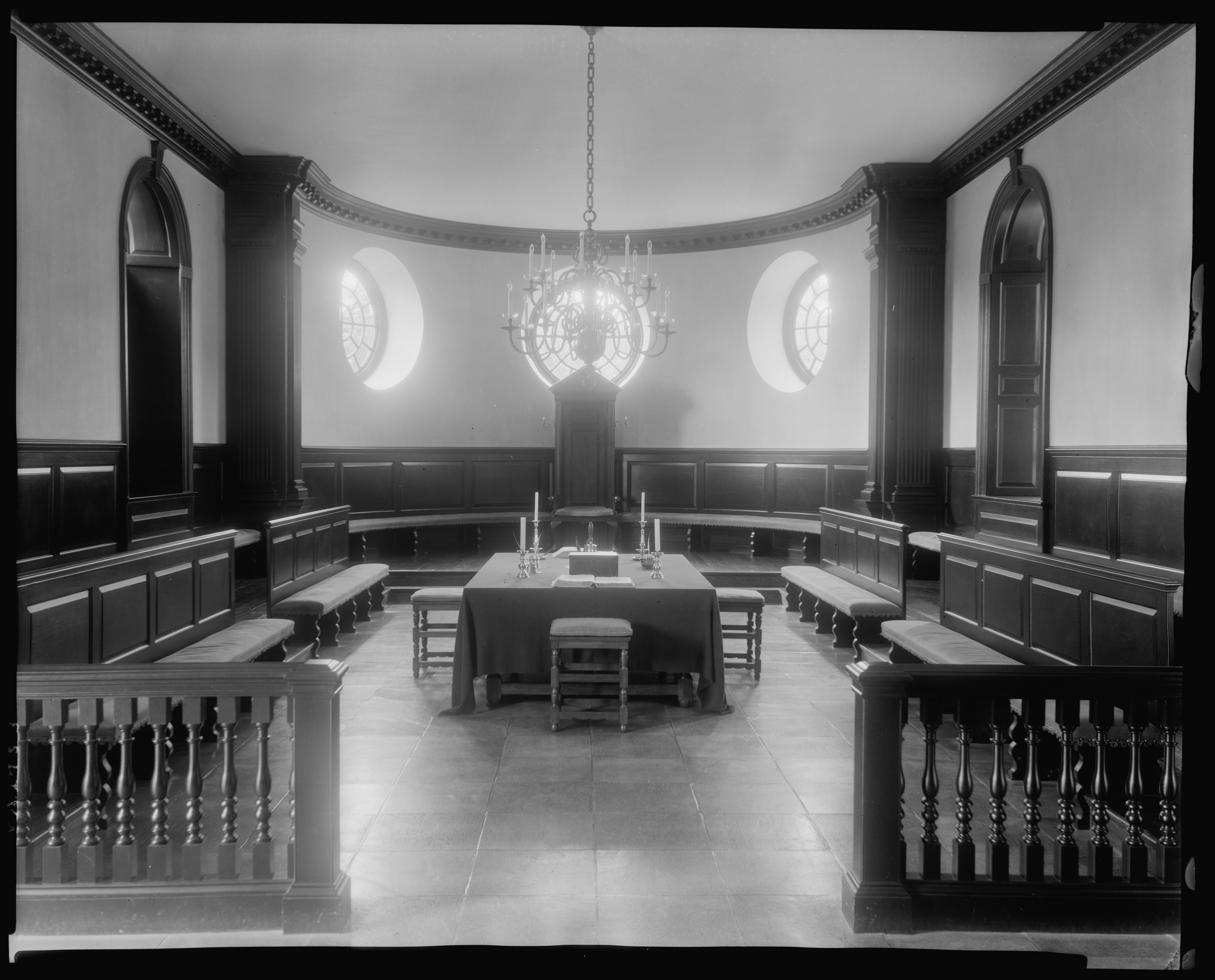
The House of Burgesses in Williamsburg, Virginia, where Mason served as a delegate from 1758 to 1761

On April 4, 1750, Mason married Ann Eilbeck, only child of William and Sarah Eilbeck of Charles County, Maryland. The Masons and Eilbecks had adjacent lands in Maryland and had joined in real estate transactions; by his death in 1764, William Eilbeck was one of the wealthiest men in Charles County. At the time of his marriage, Mason was living at Dogue's Neck, possibly at Sycamore Point. George and Ann Mason had nine children who survived to adulthood. Ann Mason died in 1773; their marriage, judging by surviving accounts, was a happy one.

Mason began to build his home, Gunston Hall, in or around 1755. The exterior, typical of local buildings of that time, was probably based on architectural books sent from Britain to America for the use of local builders; one of these craftsmen, perhaps William Waite or James Wren, constructed Gunston Hall. Mason was proud of the gardens, which still surround the house. There were outbuildings, including slave quarters, a schoolhouse, and kitchens, and beyond them four large plantations, forests, and the shops and other facilities that made Gunston Hall mostly self-sufficient.

Mason avoided overdependence on tobacco as a source of income by leasing much of his land holdings to tenant farmers, and he diversified his crops to grow wheat for export to the British West Indies as Virginia's economy sank because of tobacco overproduction in the 1760s and 1770s. Mason was a pioneer in the Virginia wine industry. Along with Thomas Jefferson, Mason and other Virginians subscribed to a scheme for growing wine grapes in America developed by Filippo Mazzei.

Mason greatly ultimately expanded the boundaries of Gunston Hall estate, so that it occupied all of Dogue's Neck, which became known as Mason's Neck. One project that Mason was involved in for most of his adult life was the Ohio Company, in which he invested in 1749 and became treasurer in 1752—an office he held forty years until his death in 1792. The Ohio Company had secured a royal grant for 200,000 acres (81,000 ha) to be surveyed near the forks of the Ohio River in present-day Pittsburgh. The challenges of the French and Indian War, Revolutionary War, and competing claims from the Province of Pennsylvania eventually led to the collapse of the Ohio Company. Although the company failed, Mason acquired considerable western lands independently. His defense against the Pennsylvania claims, Selections from the Virginia Charters, written in 1772, originally intended to promote the Ohio Company's claims, was widely applauded as a defense of the rights of Americans against royal decrees. Involvement with the Ohio Company also brought Mason into contact with many prominent Virginians, including George Washington, his Fairfax County neighbor.

Mason and George Washington were friends for many years until they finally broke over their differences regarding the federal constitution. Peter R. Henriques, in a journal article on the relationship between Mason and Washington, suggests that Mason cultivated the friendship more than Washington. Mason sent many more letters and gifts and stayed more often at Washington's residence at Mount Vernon, though this might be explained in part by the fact that Mount Vernon was located on the road from Gunston Hall to Alexandria. Henriques suggests that as Mason was older, intellectually superior, and the owner of a flourishing plantation as Washington was struggling to establish Mount Vernon, it would not have been in the future president's character to seek a close relationship with Mason. Washington, however, had deep respect for Mason's intellectual abilities, and sought Mason's advice on several occasions, writing in 1777 when learning that Mason had taken charge of an issue before the General Assembly, "I know of no person better qualified ... than Colonel Mason, and shall be very happy to hear he has taken it in hand".

Despite his involvement in western real estate, Mason saw that land was being cleared and planted with tobacco faster than the market for it could expand, meaning that its price would drop even as more and more capital was tied up in land and slaves. Thus, although a major slaveholder, he opposed the slave system in Virginia. He believed that slave importation, together with the natural population increase, would result in a huge future slave population in Virginia; a system of leased lands, though not as profitable as slave labor, would have "little Trouble & Risque [risk]".

=== Virginia House of Burgesses ===
Little is known of Mason's political views prior to the 1760s, when he came to oppose British colonial policies. In 1758, Mason successfully ran for the House of Burgesses when George William Fairfax, holder of one of Fairfax County's two seats, chose not to seek reelection. Also elected were Mason's brother Thomson for Stafford County, George Washington for Frederick County, where he was stationed as commander of Virginia's militia during the French and Indian War, and Richard Henry Lee, who worked closely with Mason through their careers.

When the House of Burgesses assembled, Mason was initially appointed to a committee concerned with raising additional militia during that time of war. In 1759, he was appointed to the powerful Committee on Privileges and Elections. He was also placed on the Committee on Propositions and Grievances, which mostly considered local matters. Mason dealt with several local concerns, presenting a petition of Fairfax County planters against being assessed for a tobacco wharf at Alexandria, funds they felt should be raised through wharfage fees. He also played a major role as the Burgesses deliberated how to divide Prince William County as settlement expanded; in March 1759, Fauquier County was created by legislative act. In this, Mason opposed the interest of the family of Thomas, Lord Fairfax, who wanted existing counties expanded instead, including Fairfax. This difference may have contributed to Mason's decision not to seek re-election in 1761. Mason biographer Jeff Broadwater notes that Mason's committee assignments reflected the esteem his colleagues held him in, or at least the potential they saw. Broadwater did not find it surprising that Mason did not seek re-election, as he did not attend the sessions between 1759 and 1761.

Although the British were victorious over the French in the war, King George III's government felt that the North American colonies were not paying their way, since little direct tax revenue from the colonies was received. The Sugar Act 1764 had its greatest effect in New England and did not cause widespread objection. The Stamp Act the following year affected all 13 colonies, as it required revenue stamps to be used on papers required in trade and in the law. When word of passage of the Stamp Act reached Williamsburg, the House of Burgesses passed the Virginia Resolves, asserting that Virginians had the same rights as if they resided in Britain, and that they could only be taxed by themselves or their elected representatives. The Resolves were mostly written by a fiery-spoken new member for Louisa County, Patrick Henry.

Mason slowly moved from being a peripheral figure towards the center of Virginia politics, but his published response to the Stamp Act, which he opposed, is most notable for the inclusion of his anti-slavery views. George Washington or George William Fairfax, the burgesses for Fairfax County, may have asked Mason's advice as to what steps to take in the crisis. Mason drafted an act to allow for one of the most common court actions, replevin, to take place without the use of stamped paper, and sent it to George Washington, by then one of Fairfax County's burgesses, to gain passage. This action contributed to a boycott of the stamps. With the courts and trade paralyzed, the British Parliament repealed the Stamp Act in 1766 but continued to assert the right to tax the colonies.

Following the repeal, a committee of London merchants issued a public letter to Americans, warning them not to declare victory. Mason published a response in June 1766, satirizing the British position, "We have, with infinite Difficulty & Fatigue got you excused this one Time; do what your Papa and Mamma bid, & hasten to return your most grateful Acknowledgements for condescending to let you keep what is your own." The Townshend Acts of 1767 were Britain's next attempt to tax the colonies, placing duties on substances including lead and glass, which provoked calls from the northern colonies for a boycott of British goods. Virginia, more dependent on goods imported from Britain, was less enthusiastic, and as local planters tended to receive goods at their river landings, a boycott would be difficult to enforce. In April 1769, Washington sent a copy of a Philadelphia resolution to Mason, asking his advice on what action Virginia should take. It is unknown who adapted that text for use in Virginia (Broadwater concludes it was Mason) but Mason sent Washington a corrected draft on April 23, 1769. Washington took it to Williamsburg, but the governor, Lord Botetourt, dissolved the legislature because of the radical resolutions it was passing. The Burgesses adjourned to a nearby tavern and there passed a non-importation agreement based on Mason's draft.

Although the resolution did not threaten to cut off tobacco, as Mason wanted, he worked in the following years for non-importation. The repeal of most of the Townshend duties made his task more difficult. In March 1773, his wife Ann died of illness contracted after another pregnancy. Mason was the sole parent to nine children, and his commitments made him even more reluctant to accept political office that would require him departing Gunston Hall.

=== Revolutionary War ===
In May 1774, Mason was in Williamsburg on real estate business. Word had just arrived of the passage of the Intolerable Acts, as Americans dubbed the legislative response to the Boston Tea Party, and a group of lawmakers including Lee, Henry, and Jefferson asked Mason to join them in formulating a course of action. The Burgesses passed a resolution for a day of fasting and prayer to obtain divine intervention against "destruction of our Civil Rights", but the governor, Lord Dunmore, dissolved the legislature rather than accept it. Mason may have helped write the resolution and likely joined the members after the dissolution when they met at Raleigh Tavern in Williamsburg.

New elections had to be held for burgess and for delegate to the convention which had been called by the rump of the dissolved House of Burgesses, and Fairfax County's were set for July 5, 1774. George Washington planned to run for one seat and tried to get Mason or Bryan Fairfax to seek the other, but both men declined. Although the poll was postponed to July 14 because of poor weather, Washington met that day with other local leaders (including, likely, Mason) in Alexandria and selected a committee to draft a set of resolutions, which Washington hoped would "define our Constitutional Rights". The resulting Fairfax Resolves were largely drafted by Mason. He met with Washington on July 17 at Mount Vernon and stayed the night; the two men rode together to Alexandria the following day. The 24 propositions that made up the Resolves protested loyalty to the British Crown but denied the right of Parliament to legislate for colonies that had been settled at private expense and which had received charters from the monarch. The Resolves called for a continental congress. If Americans did not receive redress by November 1, exports, including that of tobacco, would be cut off. The freeholders of Fairfax County approved the Resolves, appointing Mason and Washington to a special committee in the emergency. According to early Virginia historian Hugh Grigsby, at Alexandria, Mason "made his first great movement on the theatre of the Revolution".

Washington took the Resolves to the Virginia Convention in Williamsburg. Although delegates made some changes, the adopted resolution closely tracked both the Fairfax Resolves and the scheme for non-exportation of tobacco Mason had proposed some years earlier. The convention elected delegates to the First Continental Congress in Philadelphia, including Lee, Washington, and Henry, and in October 1774, Congress adopted a similar embargo.

Much of Mason's efforts in 1774 and 1775 was in organizing a militia independent of the royal government. Washington by January 1775 was drilling a small force, and he and Mason purchased gunpowder for the company. Mason wrote in favor of annual election of militia officers in words that would later echo in the Virginia Declaration of Rights, "We came equal into this world, and equals shall we go out of it. All men are by nature born equally free and independent."

Washington's election as a delegate to the Second Continental Congress created a vacancy in Fairfax County's delegation to the third Virginia Convention. In May 1775, Washington wrote from Philadelphia, urging that the vacancy be filled. By this time, blood had been shed between American patriot militias and the British Army at the Battles of Lexington and Concord, which launched the American Revolutionary War. Mason attempted to avoid election on the grounds of poor health and his obligations as a single parent to nine children. Nevertheless, he was elected and journeyed to Richmond, which, being further inland than Williamsburg, was deemed better protected from possible British attack.

When the Richmond convention began in July 1775, Mason was assigned to crucial committees, including one attempting to raise an army to protect the colony. According to Robert A. Rutland, "Sick or healthy, Mason was needed for his ability." Mason sponsored a non-exportation measure; it was passed by a large majority, though it had to be repealed later in the session to coordinate with one passed by Maryland. Despite pressure from many delegates, Mason refused to consider election as a delegate to the Second Continental Congress in place of Washington after the Congress elected Washington commanding general of the Continental Army. But Mason could not avoid election to the Committee of Safety, a powerful group that took over many functions in the governmental vacuum. Mason proffered his resignation from this committee, but it was refused.

=== Declaration of Rights ===
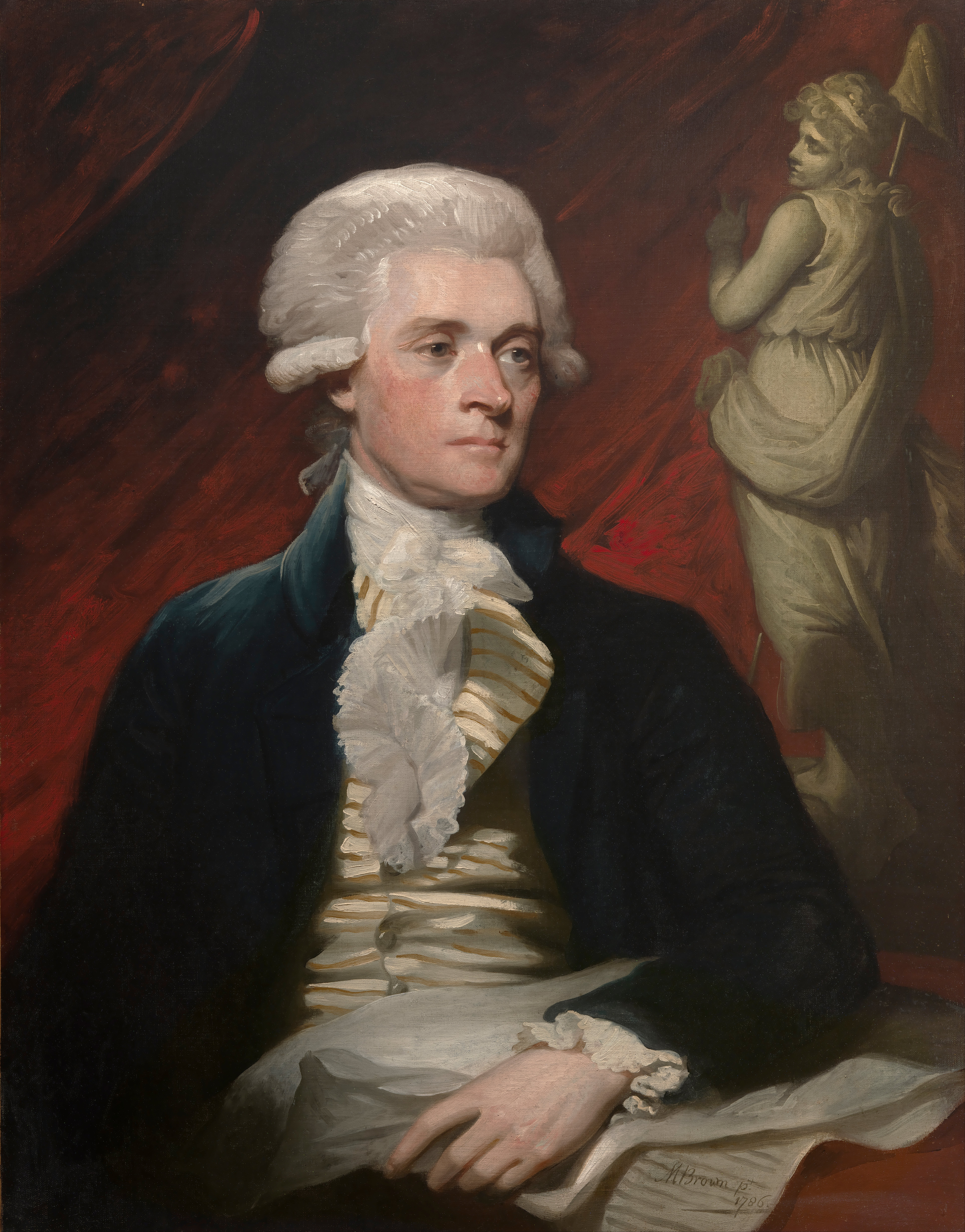
Mason's plan for Virginia's constitution was adopted over proposals by Thomas Jefferson (pictured) and others.

Illness forced Mason to abstain himself from the Committee of Safety for several weeks in 1775, and he did not attend the fourth convention, held in December 1775 and January 1776. With independence from Britain widely accepted as necessary among prominent Virginians, the fifth convention, to meet in May 1776 at Williamsburg, would need to decide how Virginia would be administered henceforth, as the royal government was dead in all but name. Accordingly, the convention was seen as so important that Lee arranged for his temporary recall from Congress to be a part of the convention, and Jefferson tried but failed to arrange to leave Congress as well. Other notables elected to the convention were Henry, George Wythe, and a young delegate from Orange County, James Madison. Mason was elected for Fairfax County, though with great difficulty.

That all men are born equally free and independent, and have certain inherent natural Rights, of which they cannot by any Compact, deprive or divest their Posterity; among which are the Enjoyment of Life and Liberty, with the Means of acquiring and possessing Property, and pursuing and obtaining Happiness and Safety.

— George Mason, draft of Article 1 of the Virginia Declaration of Rights, 1776.

That convention, in May 1776, unanimously instructed Jefferson and other Virginia delegates to Congress to seek "a clear and full Declaration of Independency". At the same time, the convention resolved to pass a declaration of rights. Ill health delayed Mason's arrival until May 18, 1776, after the vote, but he was appointed to a committee led by Archibald Cary, which was to compose a declaration of rights and constitution. Mason was skeptical that the thirty-person Cary Committee could collectively compose anything worthwhile, but he was surprised at how quickly it moved—though his membership had a role in that speed. On May 24, convention president Edmund Pendleton wrote to Jefferson about the committee's deliberations, "as Colo.[nel] Mason seems to have the ascendancy in the great work, I have Sanguine hopes it will be framed so as to Answer it's [sic] end, Prosperity to the Community and Security to Individuals".

Mason, working in a room at the Raleigh Tavern, drafted a declaration of rights and plan of government, likely to prevent frivolous plans with no chance of adoption from being put forward. Edmund Randolph later recalled that Mason's draft "swallowed up all the rest". The Virginia Declaration of Rights and the 1776 Constitution of Virginia were joint works, but Mason was the main author. Mason likely worked closely with Thomas Ludwell Lee; the earliest surviving draft shows the first ten articles in Mason's handwriting, with the other two written by Lee. The draft for the Declaration of Rights drew on Magna Carta, the English Petition of Right of 1628, and that nation's 1689 Bill of Rights. Mason's first article would be paraphrased by Jefferson soon after in drafting the American Declaration of Independence.

From the first article, cataloguing the rights of man, Mason derived the following articles, which make clear that the role of government is to secure and protect those rights, and if it fails to do so, the people have a right to amend or abolish it. Property could not be taken for public use without the owner's consent, and a citizen could only be bound by a law accepted by that person or by elected representatives. If accused, a person had the right to a speedy and local trial, based on an accusation made known to him, with the right to call for evidence and witnesses in his favor.

When the convention began to debate the declaration, it quickly bogged down on the first sentence of Article 1, which some feared would imply that slaves were their masters' equals. This was resolved by the convention adding the words "when they enter into a state of society", thus excluding slaves. Mason spoke repeatedly in the five days of debate, using oratory one hearer described as "neither flowing nor smooth, but his language was strong, his manner most impressive, and strengthened by a bit of biting cynicism when provocation made it seasonable". The Declaration of Rights was passed by the convention on June 12, 1776.

There later was a flurry of contradictory statements from convention members (including Mason) about who composed which articles. Randolph credited Henry with Articles 15 and 16, but Article 16 (dealing with religious freedom), had been written by Madison. Mason had imitated English law in drafting language requiring toleration of those of minority religions, but Madison insisted on full religious liberty, and Mason supported Madison's amendment once made.

The committee draft, likely for the most part written by Mason, received wide publicity (the final version much less so) and Mason's words "all men are born equally free and independent" were later reproduced in state constitutions from Pennsylvania to Montana; Jefferson tweaked the prose and included the sentiments in the Declaration of Independence. In 1778, Mason wrote that the Declaration of Rights "was closely imitated by the other United States". This was true, as seven of the original states, and Vermont, joined Virginia in promulgating a bill of rights. Four in addition specified rights that were protected, within the body of their constitutions. Feelings were so strong in Massachusetts that voters there in 1778 rejected a constitution drafted by a convention, insisting that a bill of rights had to come first.

=== Virginia constitution ===
Even before the convention approved the Declaration of Rights, Mason was busy at work on a constitution for Virginia. He was not the only one occupying himself so; Jefferson sent several versions from Philadelphia, one of which supplied the constitution's preamble. Essex County's Meriwether Smith may have prepared a draft, but the text is unknown. As an original writing in Mason's hand is not known, the extent to which the final draft was written by him is uncertain. On June 22, 1776, however, William Fleming sent Jefferson a copy of the draft before the Cary Committee, telling him "the inclosed [sic] printed plan was drawn by Colo. G. Mason and by him laid before the committee".

Mason had submitted his plan sometime between June 8 and 10, 1776. It named the new state the "Commonwealth of Virginia", a name chosen pointedly by Mason to indicate that power stemmed from the people. The constitution provided for a popularly elected House of Delegates, chosen annually by men who owned or leased property, or who had fathered three or more Virginians. Most governmental power resided in the House of Delegates—the governor could not even veto a bill and could only act as head of the state militia on the advice of his Council of State, whose members were elected by the legislature. The draft was considered by the committee, and it issued a report on June 24, at which time Jefferson's preamble and several amendments authored by him were included—George Wythe, who advocated for Jefferson's draft before the committee, found discussion far enough advanced that members were only willing to yield to Jefferson on a few points. The entire convention considered the document between June 26 and 28, and it was signed on June 29. Richard Henry Lee wrote the day prior to the constitution's passage by unanimous vote, "I have had the pleasure to see our new plan of Government go on well. This day will put a finishing hand to it. 'Tis very much of the democratic kind."

When the convention chose Patrick Henry as Virginia's first post-independence governor, Mason led the committee of notables sent to inform Henry of his election. There was criticism of the constitution—Edmund Randolph later wrote that the document's faults indicated that even such a great mind as Mason's was not immune from "oversights and negligences": it did not have an amending process and granted two delegates to each county regardless of population. The 1776 constitution remained in force until 1830, when another convention replaced it. According to Henry C. Riely in his journal article on Mason, "The Virginia Constitution of 1776, whatever may have been the question raised long afterwards as to the contribution of other great leaders, stands, on the authority of Jefferson, Madison, and Randolph—to mention only the highest authority—as his creation."

=== Revolutionary War legislator ===
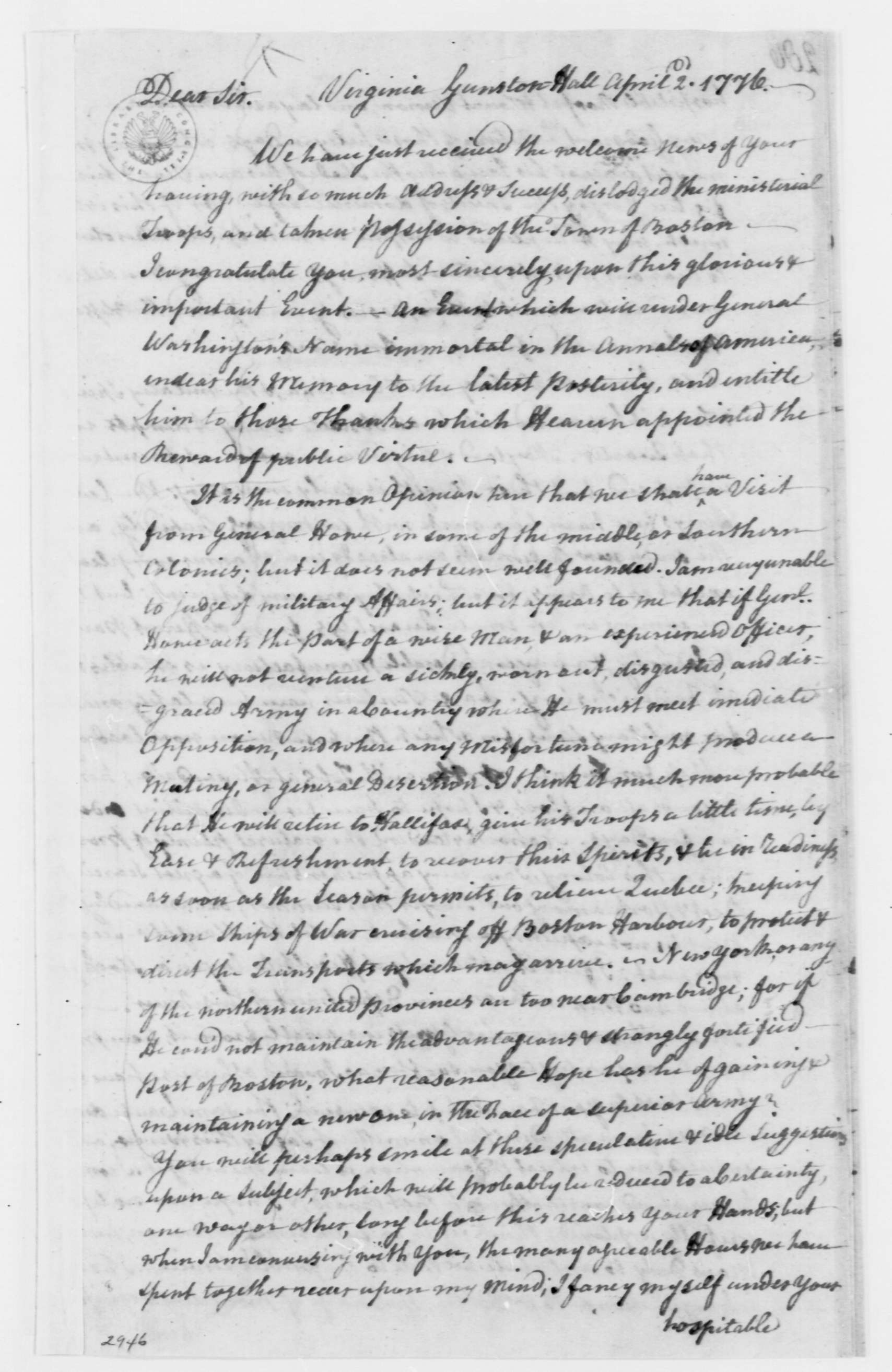
Mason's letter to George Washington in 1776, congratulating Washington on his victory in the siege of Boston

Mason devoted much effort during the American Revolutionary War to safeguarding Fairfax County and the rivers of Virginia, since the British several times raided areas along the Potomac. Control of the rivers and of Chesapeake Bay was urgent as Virginians tried to obtain hard currency by trading tobacco to the French and other European nations. The export of tobacco, generally via the West Indies, allowed Mason and others to obtain, via France and Holland, British-made items such as cloth, clothing patterns, medicines, and hardware.

Mason served as a member of the House of Delegates from 1776 to 1781, his longest continuous political service outside Fairfax County, which he represented in Richmond. The other Fairfax County seat turned over several times—Washington's stepson Jackie Custis was elected late in the war—but Mason remained the county's choice throughout. Nevertheless, Mason's health often caused him to miss meetings of the legislature, or to arrive days or weeks late. Mason in 1777 was assigned to a committee to revise Virginia's laws, with the expectation that he would take on the criminal code and land law. Mason served a few months on the committee before resigning on the ground he was not a lawyer; most of the work fell to Jefferson (returned from Philadelphia), Pendleton, and Wythe. Illness caused by a botched smallpox inoculation forced Mason to miss part of the legislature's spring 1777 session; in his absence delegates on May 22 elected him to the Continental Congress. Mason, who may have been angry that Lee had not been chosen, refused on the ground that he was needed at home and did not feel he could resign from the General Assembly without permission from his constituents. Lee was elected in his place.

This did not end the desire of Virginians to send Mason to the Continental Congress. In 1779, Lee resigned from Congress, expressing the hope that Mason, Wythe, or Jefferson would replace him in Philadelphia. General Washington was frustrated at the reluctance of many talented men to serve in Congress, writing to Benjamin Harrison that the states "should compel their ablest men to attend Congress ... Where is Mason, Wythe, Jefferson, Nicholas, Pendleton, Nelson?" Washington wrote to Mason directly:

Where are our men of abilities? Why do they not come forth to serve their Country? Let this voice my dear Sir call upon you—Jefferson & others—do not from a mistaken opinion that we are about to set down under our own Vine and our own fig tree let our heretofore noble struggle end in ignomy.

In spite of Washington's pleas, Mason remained in Virginia, plagued by illness and heavily occupied on the Committee of Safety and elsewhere in defending the Fairfax County area. Most of the legislation Mason introduced in the House of Delegates was war related, often aimed at raising the men or money needed by Congress for Washington's Continental Army. The new federal and state governments, short on cash, issued paper money. By 1777, the value of Virginia's paper money had dropped precipitously, and Mason developed a plan to redeem the notes with a tax on real estate. Mason was three weeks late in arriving at Richmond because of his illness, to the frustration of Washington, who had faith in Mason's knowledge of financial affairs. Washington wrote to Custis, "It is much to be wished that a remedy could be applied to the depreciation of our Currency ... I know of no person better qualified to do this than Colonel Mason".

Mason retained his interest in western affairs, hoping in vain to salvage the Ohio Company's land grant. He and Jefferson were among the few delegates to be told of George Rogers Clark's expedition to secure control of the lands north of the Ohio River. Mason and Jefferson secured legislation authorizing Governor Henry to defend against unspecified western enemies. The expedition was generally successful, and Mason received a report directly from Clark. Mason sought to remove differences between Virginia and other states, and although he felt the Mason–Dixon line (not named for George Mason), the 1780 settlement of the boundary dispute with Pennsylvania, was unfavorable to Virginia, he voted for it enthusiastically. Also in 1780, Mason remarried, to Sarah Brent, from a nearby plantation, who had never been married and was 52 years old. It was a marriage of convenience, with the new bride able to take some of the burden of parenting Mason's many children off his hands.

=== Post-Revolutionary War ===
Following the Treaty of Paris in 1783, which established a sovereign United States and largely ended armed hostilities, life along the Potomac River returned to normal. In December 1783, Madison returned to Gunston Hall after returning from the Second Continental Congress in Philadelphia. In 1781, the Articles of Confederation had tied the states in a loose bond, and Madison sought a more sound federal structure, seeking the proper balance between federal and state rights. He found Mason willing to consider a federal tax; Madison had feared the subject might offend his host and wrote to Jefferson of the evening's conversation. The same month, Mason spent Christmas at Mount Vernon (the only larger estate than his in Fairfax County). A fellow houseguest described Mason as "slight in figure, but not tall, and has a grand head and clear gray eyes". Mason retained his political influence in Virginia, writing Patrick Henry, who had been elected to the House of Delegates, a letter filled with advice as that body's 1783 session opened.

Mason scuttled efforts to elect him to the House of Delegates in 1784, writing that sending him to Richmond would be "an oppressive and unjust invasion of my personal liberty". His refusal disappointed Jefferson, who had hoped that the likelihood that the legislature would consider land legislation would attract Mason to Richmond. The legislature nevertheless appointed Mason a commissioner to negotiate with Maryland over navigation of the Potomac. Mason spent much time on this issue and reached agreement with Maryland delegates at the meeting in March 1785 known as the Mount Vernon Conference. Although the meeting at Washington's home came later to be seen as a first step towards the 1787 Constitutional Convention, Mason saw it simply as efforts by two states to resolve differences between them. Mason was appointed to the Annapolis Convention of 1786, at which representatives of all the states were welcome, but like most delegates he did not attend. The sparsely attended Annapolis meeting called for a conference to consider amendments to the Articles of Confederation.

To deter smuggling, Madison proposed a bill to make Norfolk the state's only legal port of entry. Five other ports, including Alexandria, were eventually added, but the Port Act proved unpopular despite the support of Washington. Mason, an opponent of the act, accepted election to the House of Delegates in 1786, and many believed that his influence would prove decisive for the repeal effort. Mason did not come to Richmond during the initial session because of illness, but he did send a petition as a private citizen to the legislature. The Port Act survived, though additional harbors were added as legal entry points.

=== Constitutional Convention (1787) ===
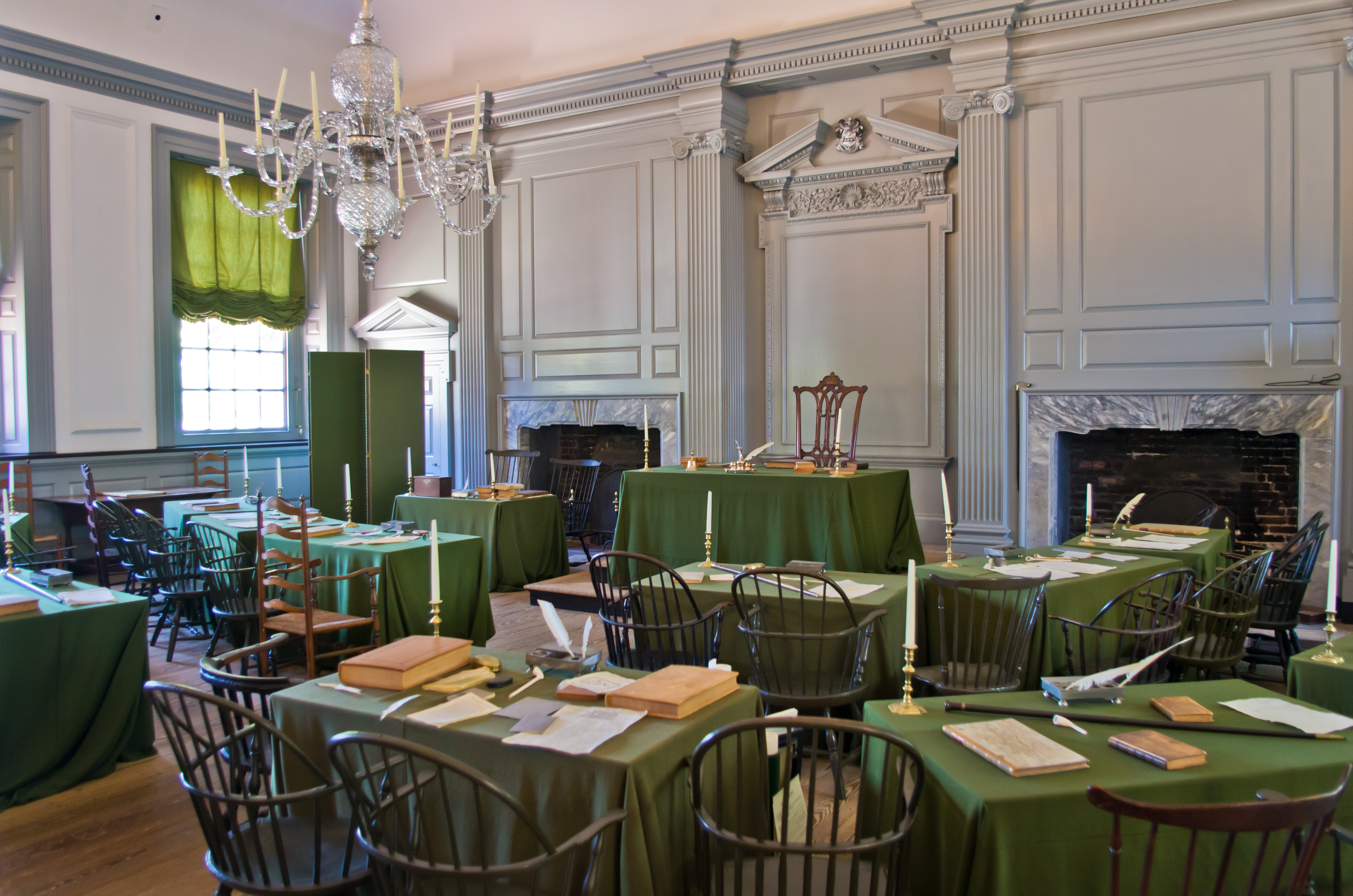
The Assembly Room in Independence Hall in Philadelphia, where the Constitutional Convention was held and the Constitution was signed and ratified

Although the Annapolis Convention saw only about a dozen delegates attend, representing only five states, it called for a meeting to be held in Philadelphia in May 1787 to devise amendments to the Articles of Confederation which would result in a more durable constitutional arrangement. Accordingly, in December 1786, the Virginia General Assembly elected seven men as the commonwealth's delegation: Washington, Mason, Henry, Randolph, Madison, Wythe, and John Blair. Henry declined appointment, and his place was given to James McClurg. Randolph, who had just been elected governor, sent three notifications of election to Mason, who accepted without any quibbles. The roads were difficult because of spring flooding, and Mason was the last Virginia delegate to arrive, on May 17, three days after the convention's scheduled opening. But it was not until May 25 that the convention formally opened, with the arrival of at least one delegate from ten of the twelve states which sent representatives (Rhode Island sent no one).

The journey to Philadelphia was Mason's first beyond Virginia and Maryland. According to Josephine T. Pacheco in her article about Mason's role at Philadelphia, "since Virginia's leaders regarded [Mason] as a wise, trustworthy man, it is not surprising that they chose him as a member of the Virginia delegation, though they must have been surprised when he accepted". Broadwater suggests that Mason went to Philadelphia because he knew the federal congress needed additional power and because he felt that body could act as a check on the powers of state legislatures. As the Virginians waited for the other delegates to arrive, they met each day and formulated what became known as the Virginia Plan. They also did some sightseeing and were presented to Pennsylvania's president, Benjamin Franklin. Within a week of arrival, Mason was bored with the social events to which the delegates were invited, "I begin to grow tired of the etiquette and nonsense so fashionable in this city".

Going into the convention, Mason wanted to see a more powerful central government than under the Articles, but not one that would threaten local interests. He feared that the more numerous Northern states would dominate the union and would impose restrictions on trade that would harm Virginia, so he sought a supermajority requirement for navigation acts. As was his constant objective, he sought to preserve the liberty he and other free white men enjoyed in Virginia, guarding against the tyranny he and others had decried under British rule. He also sought a balance of powers, seeking thereby to make a durable government; according to historian Brent Tarter, "Mason designed his home [Gunston Hall] so that no misplaced window or missing support might spoil the effect or threaten to bring down the roof; he tried to design institutions of government in the same way, so that wicked or unprincipled men could not knock loose any safeguards of liberty".

Mason had hope, coming into the convention, that it would yield a result that he felt would strengthen the United States. Impressed by the quality of the delegates, Mason expected sound thinking from them, something he did not think he had often encountered in his political career. Still, he felt that the "hopes of all the Union centre in this Convention", and wrote to his son George, "the revolt from Great Britain & the Formations of our new Government at that time, were nothing compared with the great Business now before us."

Mr. Mason is a gentleman of remarkably strong powers, and possesses a clear and copious understanding. He is able and convincing in debate, steady and firm in his principles, and undoubtedly one of the best politicians in America. Mr. Mason is close to 60 years old, with a fine strong constitution.

— William Pierce of Georgia

Mason knew few of the delegates who were not from Virginia or Maryland, but his reputation preceded him. Once delegates representing sufficient states had arrived in Philadelphia by late May, the convention held closed sessions at the Pennsylvania State House (today Independence Hall). Washington was elected the convention's president by unanimous vote, and his tremendous personal prestige as the victorious war general helped legitimize the convention but also caused him to abstain from debate. Mason had no such need to remain silent, and only four or five delegates spoke as frequently as he did. Though he ended up not signing the constitution, according to Broadwater, Mason won as many convention debates as he lost.

In the early days of the convention, Mason supported much of the Virginia Plan, which was introduced by Randolph on May 29. This plan would have a popularly elected lower house which would choose the members of the upper house from lists provided by the states. Most of the delegates had found the weak government under the Articles insufficient, and Randolph proposed that the new federal government should be supreme over the states. Mason agreed that the federal government should be more powerful than the states.

The Virginia Plan, if implemented, would base representation in both houses of the federal legislature on population. This was unsatisfactory to the smaller states. Delaware's delegates had been instructed to seek an equal vote for each state, and this became the New Jersey Plan, introduced by that New Jersey Governor William Paterson. The divisions in the convention became apparent in late June, when by a narrow vote, the convention voted that representation in the lower house be based on population, but the motion of Connecticut's Oliver Ellsworth for each state to have an equal vote in the upper house failed on a tie. With the convention deadlocked, on July 2, 1787, a grand committee was formed, with one member from each state, to seek a way out. Mason had not taken as strong a position on the legislature as had Madison, and he was appointed to the committee; Mason and Franklin were the most prominent members. The committee met over the convention's July 4 recess and proposed what became known as the Great Compromise: a House of Representatives based on population, in which money bills must originate, and a Senate with equal representation for each state. Records do not survive of Mason's participation in that committee, but the clause requiring money bills to start in the House most likely came from him or was the price of his support, as he had inserted such a clause in the Virginia Constitution, and he defended that clause once convention debate resumed. According to Madison's notes, Mason urged the convention to adopt the compromise:

However liable the Report [of the Grand Committee] might be to objections, he thought it preferable to an appeal to the world by the different sides, as had been talked of by some Gentlemen. It could not be more inconvenient to any gentleman to remain absent from his private affairs, than it was for him: but he would bury his bones in this city rather than expose his Country to the Consequences of a dissolution of the Convention without any thing being done.

=== Road to dissent ===
By mid-July, as delegates began to move past the stalemate to a framework built upon the Great Compromise, Mason had considerable influence in the convention. North Carolina's William Blount was unhappy that those from his state "were in Sentiment with Virginia who seemed to take the lead. Madison at their Head tho Randolph and Mason also great". Mason had failed to carry his proposals that senators must own property and not be in debt to the United States, but he successfully argued that the minimum age for service in Congress should be 25, telling the convention that younger men were too immature. Mason was the first to propose that the national seat of government not be in a state capital lest the local legislature be too influential. He voted against proposals to base representation on a state's wealth or taxes paid and supported regular reapportionment of the House of Representatives.

On August 6, 1787, the convention received a tentative draft written by a Committee of Detail chaired by South Carolina's John Rutledge; Randolph had represented Virginia. The draft was acceptable to Mason as a basis for discussion, containing such points important to him as the requirement that money bills originate in the House and not be amendable in the Senate. Nevertheless, Mason felt the upper house was too powerful, as it had the powers to make treaties, appoint Supreme Court justices, and adjudicate territorial disputes between the states. The draft lacked provision for a council of revision, something Mason and others considered a serious lack.

The convention spent several weeks in August debating the powers of Congress. Although Mason was successful in some of his proposals, such as placing the state militias under federal regulation and a ban on Congress passing an export tax, he lost on some that he deemed crucial. These losses included the convention deciding to allow importation of slaves to continue to at least 1800 (later amended to 1808) and to allow a simple majority to pass navigation acts that might require Virginians to export their tobacco in American-flagged ships, when it might be cheaper to use foreign-flagged vessels. The convention also weakened the requirement that money bills begin in the House and not be subject to amendment in the Senate, eventually striking the latter clause after debate that stretched fitfully over weeks. Despite these defeats, Mason continued to work constructively to build a constitution, serving on another grand committee that considered customs duties and ports.

On August 31, 1787, Massachusetts's Elbridge Gerry spoke against the document as a whole, as did Luther Martin of Maryland. When Gerry moved to postpone consideration of the final document, Mason seconded him, stating, according to Madison, that "he would sooner chop off his right hand than put it to the Constitution as it now stands". Still, Mason did not rule out signing it, saying that he wanted to see how certain matters still before the convention were settled before deciding a final position, whether to sign or ask for a second convention. As the final touches were made to the constitution, Mason and Gerry held meetings in the evening to discuss strategy, bringing in delegates representing states from Connecticut to Georgia.

There is no declaration of rights, and the laws of the general government being paramount, the declarations in the separate states are no security ... The president has no constitutional council. From this defect spring the improper powers of the Senate and the unnecessary office of the vice-president, who, as president of the Senate, dangerously blends executive and legislative powers ... There is no section preserving liberty of the press or trial by jury in civil cases, nor is there one concerning the danger of standing armies in time of peace.

— George Mason, Objections to this Constitution of Government

Mason's misgivings about the constitution were increased on September 12, when Gerry proposed and Mason seconded that there be a committee appointed to write a bill of rights, to be part of the text of the constitution. Connecticut's Roger Sherman noted that the state bills of rights would remain in force, to which Mason responded, "the Laws of the United States are to be paramount [supreme] to State Bills of Rights." Although Massachusetts abstained in deference to Gerry, the Virginians showed no desire to conciliate Mason in their votes, as the motion failed with no states in favor and ten opposed. Also on September 12, the Committee on Style submitted its final draft, and Mason began to list objections on his copy. On September 15, as the convention continued a clause-by-clause consideration of the draft, Mason, Randolph, and Gerry stated they would not sign the constitution.

On September 17, members of the twelve delegations then present in Philadelphia signed the constitution, except for the three men who had stated they would not. As the document was sent to the Articles of Confederation's Congress in New York, Mason sent a copy of his objections to Richard Henry Lee, a member of the Congress.

== Ratification battle ==
Broadwater notes, "given the difficulty of the task he had set for himself, his stubborn independence, and his lack, by 1787, of any concern for his own political future, it is not surprising that he left Philadelphia at odds with the great majority of his fellow delegates". Madison recorded that Mason, believing that the convention had given his proposals short shrift in a hurry to complete its work, began his journey back to Virginia "in an exceeding ill humor". Mason biographer Helen Hill Miller notes that before Mason returned to Gunston Hall, he was injured in body as well as spirit after an accident on the road. Word of Mason's opposition stance had reached Fairfax County even before the convention ended; most local sentiment was in favor of the document. Washington made a statement urging ratification but otherwise remained silent, knowing he would almost certainly be the first president. Mason sent Washington a copy of his objections, but Washington believed that the choice was ratification or disaster.

The constitution was to be ratified by state conventions, with nine approvals necessary for it to come into force. In practice, opposition by large states such as New York or Virginia would make it hard for the new government to function. Mason remained a member of the House of Delegates, and in late October 1787, the legislature called a convention for June 1788; in language crafted by John Marshall, it decreed that the Virginia Ratifying Convention would be allowed "free and ample discussion". Mason was less influential in his final session in the House of Delegates because of his strong opposition to ratification, and his age (61) may also have caused him to be less effective.

As smaller states ratified the constitution in late 1787 and early 1788, there was an immense quantity of pamphlets and other written matter for and against approval. Most prominent in support were the pamphlets later collected as The Federalist, written by Madison and two New Yorkers, Alexander Hamilton and John Jay; Mason's objections were widely cited by opponents. Mason had begun his Objections to this Constitution of Government in Philadelphia; in October 1787, it was published, though without his permission. Madison complained that Mason had gone beyond the reasons for opposing he had stated in convention, but Broadwater suggested the major difference was one of tone, since the written work dismissed as useless the constitution and the proposed federal government. Nevertheless, both Lee and Mason believed that if proper amendments were made, the constitution would be a fine instrument of governance. The Objections were widely cited in opposition to ratification, and Mason was criticized for placing his own name on it, at a time when political tracts were signed, if at all, with pen names such as Junius, so that the author's reputation would not influence the debate. Despite this, Mason's Objections were among the most influential Anti-Federalist works, and its opening line, "There is no Declaration of Rights", likely their most effective slogan.

Virginians were reluctant to believe that greatly respected figures such as Washington and Franklin would be complicit in setting up a tyrannical system. There were broad attacks on Mason; the New Haven Gazette suggested that he had not done much for his country during the war, in marked contrast to Washington. Oliver Ellsworth blamed the Virginia opposition on the Lee family, who had long had tensions with the Washington family, and on "the madness of Mason". Tarter, in his American National Biography article on Mason, wrote that "the rigidity of [Mason's] views and his increasingly belligerent personality produced an intolerance and intemperance in his behavior that surprised and angered Madison, with whom he had worked closely at the beginning of the convention, and Washington, who privately condemned Mason's actions during the ratification struggle."

In Richmond from October 1787 until January 1788 representing Fairfax County in the House of Delegates, Mason faced difficulties in winning election to the ratifying convention from his home county, since most Fairfax freeholders were Federalist, and local courthouse politics put him at odds with many in Alexandria. The statute governing elections to the convention in Richmond allowed Mason to seek election where he owned property, and he sought election in Stafford County. He assured voters that he did not seek disunion, but rather reform, and spoke against the unamended constitution in strong terms. George Nicholas, a Federalist friend of Mason, believed that Mason felt he could lead Virginia to gain concessions from the other states, and that he was embittered by the continuing attacks on him. On March 10, 1788, Mason finished first in the polls in Stafford County, and veteran delegate Andrew Buchanan won the other seat over Colonel Carter and William Fitzhugh. Two days later, a Richmond essayist criticized Mason and Richard Henry Lee (who did not attend) for the "barefaced impudence and folly" of public protests. Mason apparently was the only person elected to that convention for a constituency in which he did not live (although historically many of his ancestors had lived in and represented the county). Voter turnout was low, as many in remote areas without newspapers knew little about the constitution. The Federalists were believed to have a slight advantage in elected delegates; Mason thought that the convention would be unlikely to ratify the document without demanding amendments.

By the time the Richmond convention opened in June, Randolph had abandoned the Anti-Federalist cause, which damaged efforts by Mason and Henry to co-ordinate with their counterparts in New York. Mason moved that the convention consider the document clause by clause, which may have played into the hands of the Federalists, who feared what the outcome of an immediate vote might be, and who had more able leadership in Richmond, including Marshall and Madison. Nevertheless, Broadwater suggested that as most delegates had declared their views before the election, Mason's motion made little difference. Henry, far more a foe of a strong federal government than was Mason, took the lead for his side in the debate. Mason spoke several times in the discussion, on topics ranging from the pardon power (which he predicted the president would use corruptly) to the federal judiciary, which he warned would lead to suits in the federal courts by citizens against states where they did not live. John Marshall, a future Chief Justice of the United States, downplayed the concern regarding the judiciary, but Mason would later be proved correct in the case of Chisholm v. Georgia (1793), which led to the passage of the Eleventh Amendment.

The Federalists initially did not have a majority, with the balance held by undeclared delegates, mainly from western Virginia (today's Kentucky). The Anti-Federalists suffered repeated blows during the convention due to the defection of Randolph and as news came other states had ratified. Mason led a group of Anti-Federalists which drafted amendments: even the Federalists were open to supporting them, though the constitution's supporters wanted the document drafted in Philadelphia ratified first.

After some of the Kentuckians had declared for ratification, the convention considered a resolution to withhold ratification pending the approval of a declaration of rights. Supported by Mason but opposed by Madison, Light-Horse Harry Lee, Marshall, Nicholas, Randolph and Bushrod Washington, the resolution failed, 88–80. Mason then voted in the minority as Virginia ratified the constitution on June 25, 1788, by a vote of 89–79. Following the ratification vote, Mason served on a committee chaired by George Wythe, charged with compiling a final list of recommended amendments, and Mason's draft was adopted, but for a few editorial changes. Unreconciled to the result, Mason prepared a fiery written argument, but some felt the tone too harsh and Mason agreed not to publish it.

== Final years ==
Defeated at Richmond, Mason returned to Gunston Hall, where he devoted himself to family, local affairs and his own health, though still keeping up a vigorous correspondence with political leaders. He resigned from the Fairfax County Court after an act passed by the new Congress required officeholders to take an oath to support the constitution, and in 1790 declined a seat in the Senate which had been left vacant by William Grayson's death, stating that his health would not permit him to serve, even if he had no other objection. The seat went to James Monroe, who had supported Mason's Anti-Federalist stance, and who had, in 1789, lost to Madison for a seat in the House of Representatives. Judging by his correspondence, Mason softened his stance towards the new federal government, telling Monroe that the constitution "wisely & Properly directs" that ambassadors be confirmed by the Senate. Although Mason predicted that the amendments to be proposed to the states by the First Congress would be "Milk & Water Propositions", he displayed "much Satisfaction" at what became the Bill of Rights (ratified in 1791) and wrote that if his concerns about the federal courts and other matters were addressed, "I could cheerfully put my Hand & Heart to the new Government".

You know the friendship which has long existed (indeed from our early youth) between General Washington and myself. I believe there are few men in whom he placed greater confidence; but it is possible my opposition to the new government, both as a member of the national and of the Virginia Convention, may have altered the case.

— George Mason to his son John, 1789

Washington, who was in 1789 elected the first president, resented Mason's strong stances against the ratification of the constitution, and these differences destroyed their friendship. Although some sources accept that Mason dined at Mount Vernon on November 2, 1788, Peter R. Henriques noted that Washington's diary states that Mr. George Mason was the guest, and as Washington, elsewhere in his diary, always referred to his former colleague at Philadelphia as Colonel Mason, the visitor was likely George Mason V, the son. Mason always wrote positively of Washington, and the president said nothing publicly, but in a letter referred to Mason as a "quondam friend" who would not recant his position on the constitution because "pride on the one hand, and want of manly candour on the other, will not I am certain let him acknowledge error in his opinions respecting it [the federal government] though conviction should flash on his mind as strongly as a ray of light". Rutland suggested that the two men were alike in their intolerance of opponents and suspicion of their motives.

Mason had long battled against Alexandria merchants who he felt unfairly dominated the county court, if only because they could more easily get to the courthouse. In 1789, he drafted legislation to move the courthouse to the center of the county, though it did not pass in his lifetime. In 1798, the legislature passed an authorizing act, and the courthouse opened in 1801. (Note: Alexandria was temporarily included within the District of Columbia, though later returned to Virginia. Today, the 1801 Fairfax courthouse, which remained a working courthouse until the early 21st century, stands in an enclave of Fairfax County within the independent city of Fairfax, Virginia.) Most of those at Gunston Hall, both family and slaves, fell ill during the summer of 1792, experiencing chills and fever; when those subsided, Mason caught a chest cold. When Jefferson visited Gunston Hall on October 1, 1792, he found Mason, then suffering from gout, needing a crutch to walk, though still sound in mind and memory. Additional ailments, possibly pneumonia, set in. Less than a week after Jefferson's visit, on October 7, George Mason died at Gunston Hall, and was subsequently buried on the estate, within sight of the house he had built and of the Potomac River.

Although Mason's death attracted little notice, aside from a few mentions in local newspapers, Jefferson mourned "a great loss". Another future president, Monroe, stated that Mason's "patriotic virtues thro[ugh] the revolution will ever be remembered by the citizens of this country".

== Views on slavery ==
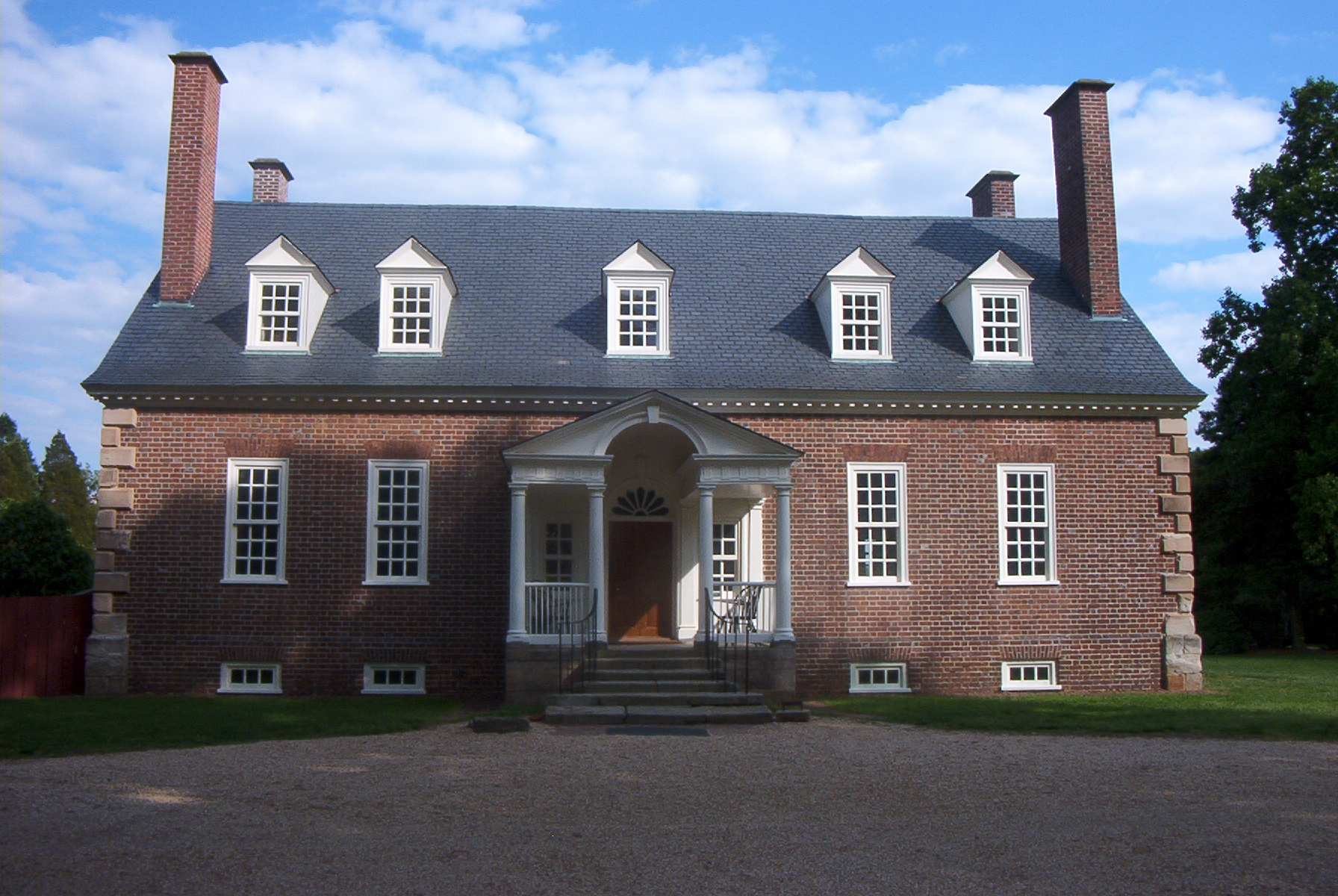
Gunston Hall in May 2006

Mason routinely spoke out against slavery, even before America's independence. In 1773, he wrote that slavery was "that slow Poison, which is daily contaminating the Minds & Morals of our People. Every Gentlemen here is born a petty Tyrant." In 1774, he advocated ending the international slave trade.

Like nearly all large plantation owners in Virginia at the time, Mason owned many slaves. In Fairfax County, only George Washington owned more, and Mason is not known to have freed any, even in his March 1773 will ultimately transcribed into the Fairfax County probate records in October 1792 (the original was then lost). That will divided his slaves among his children (between twenty and three years old when Mason wrote it). Mason would continue trading in land as well as remarry (with a marriage agreement recorded in Prince William County in April 1780), and Virginia legalized manumission in May 1782. The childless Washington, in his will executed shortly before his death, ordered his slaves be freed after his wife's death, and Jefferson manumitted a few slaves, mostly of the Hemings family, including his own children by Sally Hemings. According to Broadwater, "In all likelihood, Mason believed, or convinced himself, that he had no options. Mason would have done nothing that might have compromised the financial futures of his nine children." Peter Wallenstein, in his article about how writers have interpreted Mason, argued that he could have freed some slaves without harming his children's future, if he had wanted to.

Mason's biographers and interpreters have long differed about how to present his views on slavery-related issues. Mason's great-great-grandniece Kate Mason Rowland, a charter member of the United Daughters of the Confederacy published a two-volume biography in 1892. Broadwater noted that she wrote "during the heyday of Jim Crow" and denied that Mason (her ancestor) was "an abolitionist in the modern sense of the term", arguing that Mason "regretted" slavery and was against the slave trade, but wanted slavery protected in the constitution. In 1919, Robert C. Mason published a biography of his prominent ancestor and asserted that George Mason "agreed to free his own slaves and was the first known abolitionist", refusing to sign the constitution, among other reasons because "as it stood then it did not abolish slavery or make preparation for its gradual extinction". Rutland, writing in 1961, asserted that in Mason's final days, "only the coalition [between New England and the Deep South at the Constitutional Convention] in Philadelphia that had bargained away any hope of eliminating slavery left a residue of disgust." Catherine Drinker Bowen, in her widely read 1966 account of the Constitutional Convention, Miracle at Philadelphia, contended that Mason believed slaves to be citizens and was "a fervent abolitionist before the word was coined".

Others took a more nuanced view. Pamela C. Copeland and Richard K. MacMaster deemed Mason's views similar to other Virginians of his class: "Mason's experience with slave labor made him hate slavery but his heavy investment in slave property made it difficult for him to divest himself of a system that he despised". According to Wallenstein, "whatever his occasional rhetoric, George Mason was—if one must choose—proslavery, not antislavery. He acted in behalf of Virginia slaveholders, not Virginia slaves". Broadwater noted, "Mason consistently voiced his disapproval of slavery. His 1787 attack on slavery echoes a similar speech to the Virginia Convention of 1776. His conduct was another matter."

According to Wallenstein, historians and other writers "have had great difficulty coming to grips with Mason in his historical context, and they have jumbled the story in related ways, misleading each other and following each other's errors". Some of this is due to conflation of Mason's views on slavery with that of his desire to ban the African slave trade, which he unquestionably opposed and fought against. His record otherwise is mixed: Virginia banned the importation of slaves from abroad in 1778, while Mason was in the House of Delegates. In 1782, after he had returned to Gunston Hall, it enacted legislation that allowed manumission of adult slaves young enough to support themselves (not older than 45). However, a proposal, supported by Mason, to require freed slaves to leave Virginia within a year or be sold at auction, was defeated. Broadwater asserted, "Mason must have shared the fears of Jefferson and countless other whites that whites and free blacks could not live together".

The contradiction between wanting protection for slave property, while opposing the slave trade, was pointed out by delegates to the Richmond convention such as George Nicholas, a supporter of ratification. Mason stated of slavery, "it is far from being a desirable property. But it will involve us in great difficulties and infelicity to be now deprived of them."

== Sites and remembrance ==
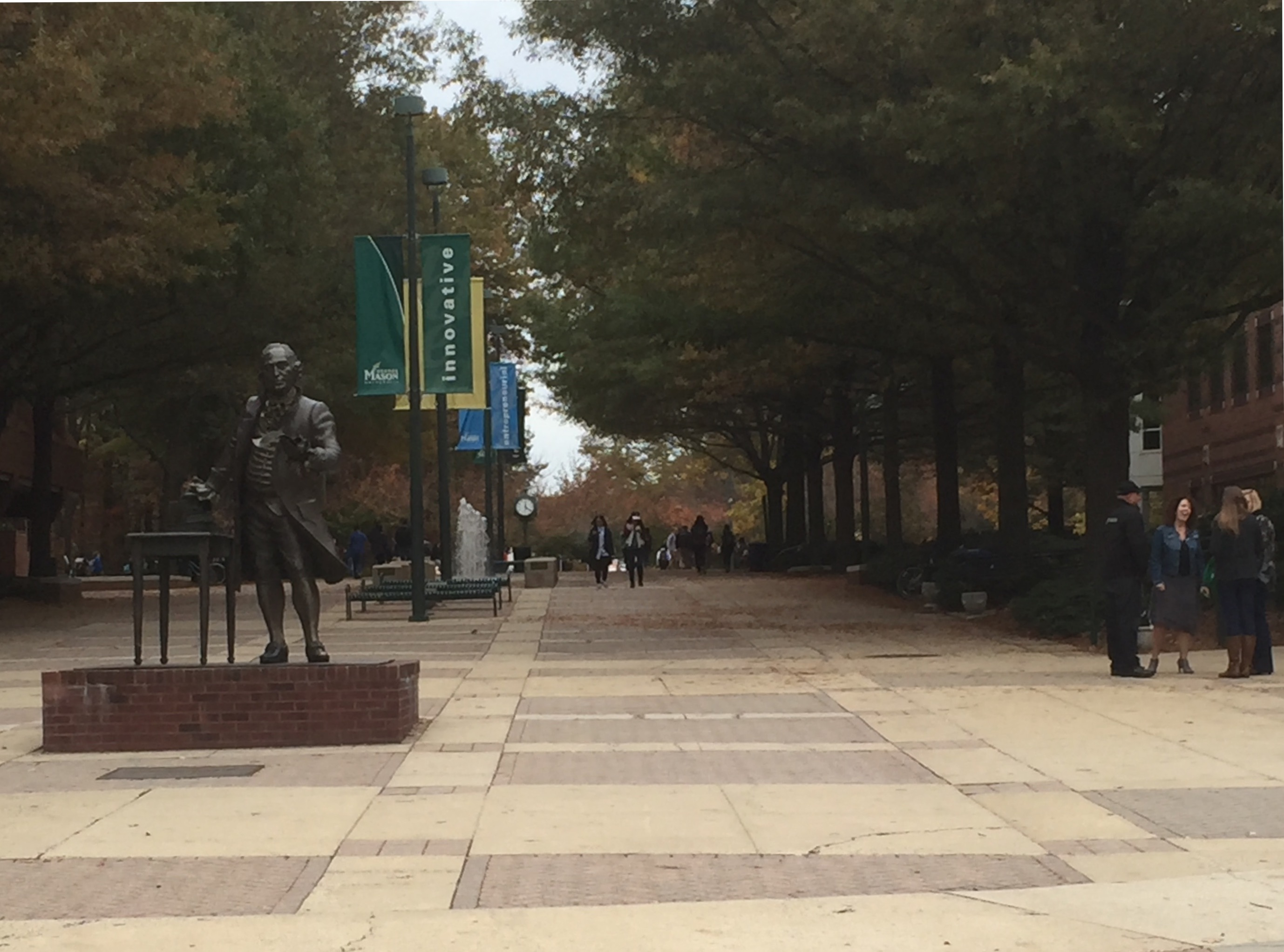
George Mason University in Fairfax, Virginia, named in honor of Mason, with a statue of him, in 2015.

There are sites remembering George Mason in Fairfax County. Gunston Hall, donated to the Commonwealth of Virginia by its last private owner, is now "dedicated to the study of George Mason, his home and garden, and life in 18th-century Virginia". George Mason University, with its main campus adjacent to the city of Fairfax, was formerly George Mason College of the University of Virginia from 1959 until it received its present name in 1972. A major landmark on the Fairfax campus is a statue of George Mason by Wendy M. Ross, depicted as he presents his first draft of the Virginia Declaration of Rights.

The George Mason Memorial Bridge, part of the 14th Street Bridge, connects Northern Virginia to Washington, D.C. The George Mason Memorial in West Potomac Park in Washington, also with a statue by Ross, was dedicated on April 9, 2002.

Mason was honored in 1981 by the United States Postal Service with an 18-cent Great Americans series postage stamp. A bas-relief of Mason appears in the Chamber of the U.S. House of Representatives as one of 23 honoring great lawmakers. Mason's image is located above and to the right of the Speaker's chair; he and Jefferson are the only Americans recognized.

== Legacy and historical view ==
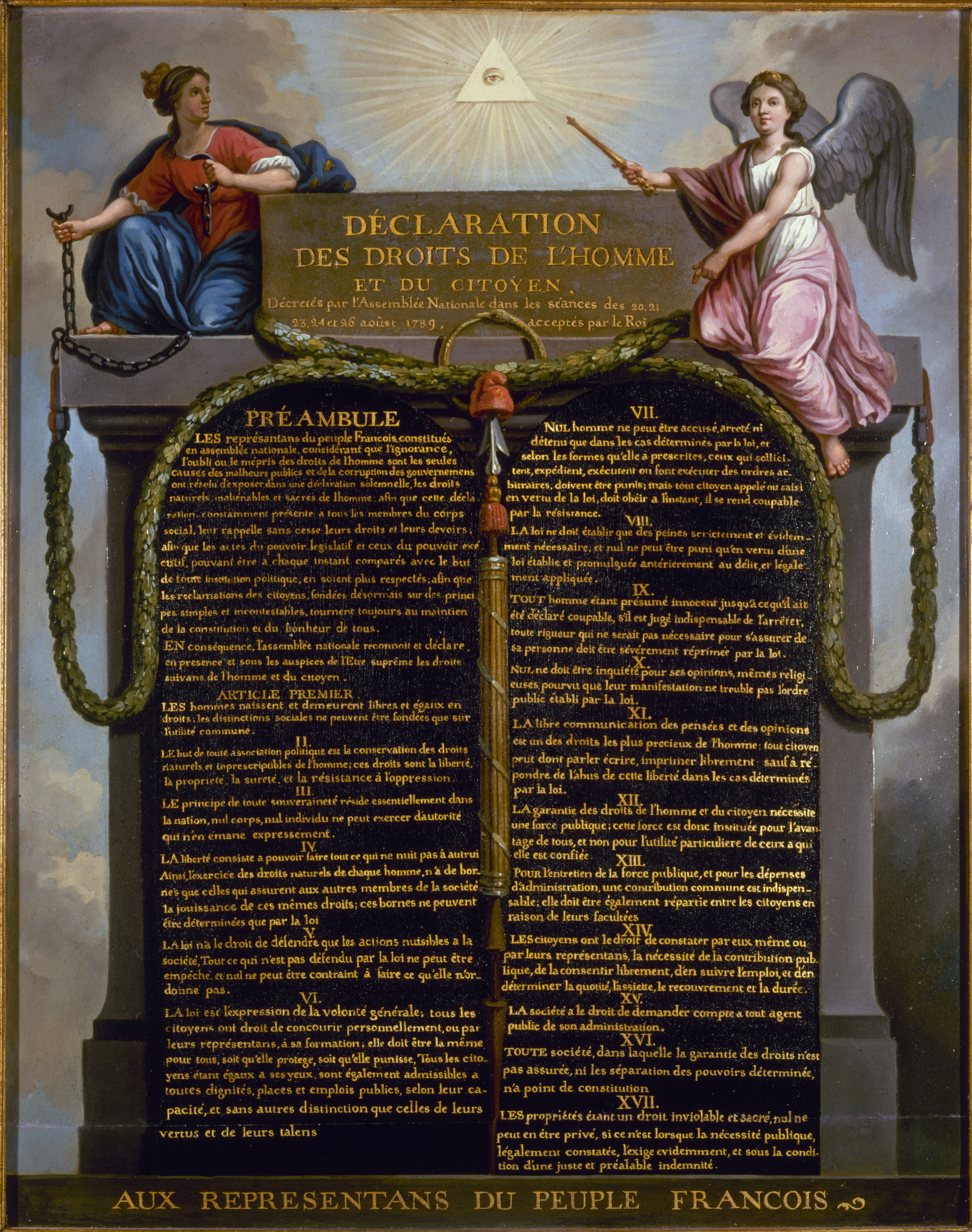
"Declaration of the Rights of Man and of the Citizen", written mainly by Marquis de Lafayette under Thomas Jefferson's influence, was based on ideals codified by Mason and was a summation of ideals that inspired the French Revolution.

Although Mason did not sign either the Declaration or the Constitution, the ideas he championed lived in prominence while their author's star faded. According to Miller, "The succession of New World constitutions of which Virginia's, with Mason as its chief architect, was the first, declared the source of political authority to be the people ... in addition to making clear what a government was entitled to do, most of them were prefaced by a list of individual rights of the citizens ... rights whose maintenance was government's primary reason for being. Mason wrote the first of these lists." Diane D. Pikcunas, in her article prepared for the bicentennial of the U.S. Bill of Rights, wrote that Mason "made the declaration of rights as his personal crusade". Tarter deemed Mason "celebrated as a champion of constitutional order and one of the fathers of the Bill of Rights". Supreme Court associate justice Sandra Day O'Connor agreed, "George Mason's greatest contribution to present day Constitutional law was his influence on our Bill of Rights".

Mason's legacy extended overseas, doing so even in his lifetime, and though he never visited Europe, his ideals did. Lafayette's "Declaration of the Rights of Man and of the Citizen" was written in the early days of the French Revolution under the influence of Jefferson, the U.S. Minister to France. According to historian R.R. Palmer, "there was in fact a remarkable parallel between the French Declaration and the Virginia Declaration of 1776". Another scholar, Richard Morris, concurred, deeming the resemblance between the two texts "too close to be coincidental": "the Virginia statesman George Mason might well have instituted an action of plagiarism".

Donald J. Senese, in the conclusion to the collection of essays on Mason published in 1989, noted that several factors contributed to Mason's obscurity in the century after his death. Mason was older than many of those who served in Philadelphia and subsequently came into prominence with the new federal government. Mason died soon after the constitution came into force and displayed no ambition for federal office, declining a seat in the Senate. Mason left no extensive paper trail and, unlike Franklin, who authored an autobiography, left no diary like Washington or John Adams. Washington left papers collected into 100 volumes; for Mason, many of whose documents lost to fire, there were only three that endured. Mason fought on the side that failed, both at Philadelphia and Richmond, leaving him a loser in a history written by winners, even his speeches to the Constitutional Convention descend through the pen of Madison, a supporter of ratification. After the Richmond convention, he was, according to Senese, "a prophet without honor in his own country".

The increased scrutiny of Mason which has accompanied his rise from obscurity has meant, according to Tarter, that "his role in the creation of some of the most important texts of American liberty is not as clear as it seems". Rutland suggested that Mason showed only "belated concern over the personal rights of citizens". Focusing on Mason's dissent from the constitution, Miller pointed to the intersectional bargain struck over navigation acts and the slave trade, "Mason lost on both counts, and the double defeat was reflected in his attitude thereafter." Wallenstein concluded, "the personal and economic interests of Mason's home state took precedence over a bill of rights".

Whatever his motivations, Mason proved a forceful advocate for a bill of rights whose Objections helped accomplish his aims. Rutland noted that "from the opening phrase of his Objections to the Bill of Rights that James Madison offered in Congress two years later, the line is so direct that we can say that Mason forced Madison's hand. Federalist supporters of the Constitution could not overcome the protest caused by Mason's phrase 'There is no declaration of rights'." O'Connor wrote that "Mason lost his battle against ratification ... [but] his ideals and political activities have significantly influenced our constitutional jurisprudence." Wallenstein felt that there is much to be learned from Mason:

A provincial slaveholding tobacco planter took his turn as a revolutionary. In tune with some of the leading intellectual currents of the Western world, he played a central role in drafting a declaration of rights and the 1776 Virginia state constitution. For his own reasons, he fought against ratifying the handiwork of the 1787 Philadelphia convention ... Two centuries later, perhaps we can come to terms with his legacy—with how far we have come, how much we have gained, whether because of him or despite him, and, too, with how much we may have lost. Surely there is much of Mason that we cherish, wish to keep, and can readily celebrate.

== See also ==
- History of the United States Constitution
- List of civil rights leaders

== Bibliography ==
- Bailey, Kenneth P. (October 1943). "George Mason, Westerner". The William and Mary Quarterly. 23 (4): 409–417. doi:10.2307/1923192. JSTOR 1923192.(subscription required)
- Broadwater, Jeff (2006). George Mason, Forgotten Founder. Chapel Hill, North Carolina: University of North Carolina Press. ISBN 978-0807830536. OCLC 67239589.
- Chester, Edward W. (1989). "George Mason: Influence Beyond the United States". In Senese, Donald J. (ed.). George Mason and the Legacy of Constitutional Liberty. Fairfax County History Commission. pp. 128–146. ISBN 0962390518.
- Copeland, Pamela C.; MacMaster, Richard K. (1975). The Five George Masons: Patriots and Planters of Virginia and Maryland. University Press of Virginia. ISBN 0813905508.
- Henriques, Peter R. (April 1989). "An Uneven Friendship: The Relationship between George Washington and George Mason". The Virginia Magazine of History and Biography. 97 (2): 185–204. JSTOR 4249070.(subscription required)
- Horrell, Joseph (1989). "George Mason and the Fairfax Court". In Senese, Donald J. (ed.). George Mason and the Legacy of Constitutional Liberty. Fairfax County History Commission. pp. 15–31. ISBN 0962390518.
- Kukla, Jon (1992). "Yes! No! And If ... Federalists, Antifederalists, and Virginia's 'Federalists Who Are For Amendments'". In Senese, Donald J. (ed.). Antifederalism: The Legacy of George Mason. George Mason University Press. pp. 43–78. ISBN 0913969478.
- McDonald, Robert (2008). "Mason, George (1725–1792)". In Hamowy, Ronald (ed.). The Encyclopedia of Libertarianism. Thousand Oaks, CA: Sage; Cato Institute. p. 321. doi:10.4135/9781412965811.n194. ISBN 978-1412965804. LCCN 2008009151. OCLC 750831024. Archived from the original on September 27, 2024.
- Miller, Helen Hill (1975). George Mason, Gentleman Revolutionary. The University of North Carolina Press. ISBN 0807812501.
- O'Connor, Sandra Day (1989). "George Mason – His Lasting Influence". In Senese, Donald J. (ed.). George Mason and the Legacy of Constitutional Liberty. Fairfax County History Commission. pp. 119–127. ISBN 0962390518.
- Pacheco, Josephine T. (1989). "George Mason and the Constitution". In Senese, Donald J. (ed.). George Mason and the Legacy of Constitutional Liberty. Fairfax County History Commission. pp. 61–74. ISBN 0962390518.
- Pikcunas, Diane D. (1989). "George Mason: The Preparation for Leadership". In Senese, Donald J. (ed.). George Mason and the Legacy of Constitutional Liberty. Fairfax County History Commission. pp. 15–31. ISBN 0962390518.
- Riely, Henry C. (January 1934). "George Mason". The Virginia Magazine of History and Biography. 42 (1): 1–17. JSTOR 4244557.(subscription required)
- Rutland, Robert A. (1970). The Papers of George Mason. Vol. 3. University of North Carolina Press. ISBN 978-0807811344.
- Rutland, Robert Allen (1980) [1961]. George Mason, Reluctant Statesman (Louisiana paperback ed.). The Louisiana State University Press. ISBN 978-0807106969.
- Rutland, Robert Allen (1989). "George Mason's Objections and the Bill of Rights". In Senese, Donald J. (ed.). George Mason and the Legacy of Constitutional Liberty. Fairfax County History Commission. pp. 75–81. ISBN 0962390518.
- Senese, Donald J. (1989). "George Mason – Why the Forgotten Founding Father". In Senese, Donald J. (ed.). George Mason and the Legacy of Constitutional Liberty. Fairfax County History Commission. pp. 147–152. ISBN 0962390518.
- Tarter, Brent (July 1991). "George Mason and the Conservation of Liberty". The Virginia Magazine of History and Biography. 99 (3): 279–304. JSTOR 4249228.
- Tompkins, William F. (September 1947). "George Mason and Gunston Hall". The Georgia Historical Quarterly. 31 (3): 181–190. JSTOR 40577068.(subscription required)
- Wallenstein, Peter (April 1994). "Flawed Keepers of the Flame: The Interpreters of George Mason". The Virginia Magazine of History and Biography. 102 (2). Virginia Historical Society: 229–260. JSTOR 4249431.
