= Augustus Rhodes Sollers =

American politician (1814–1862)

Augustus Rhodes Sollers (May 1, 1814 – November 26, 1862) was an American politician who represented the seventh congressional district of the state of Maryland from 1841 to 1843, and the sixth congressional district from 1853 to 1855. He was a member of the Whig Party (United States). He was born near Prince Frederick, Maryland, and was admitted to the bar in 1836. He served as a member of the State Constitutional Convention of 1851, which drafted and submitted the Maryland Constitution of 1851. He practiced law until his death in Prince Frederick, and is buried there at St. Paul's Churchyard.

U.S. House of Representatives
| Preceded by Daniel Jenifer | Member of the U.S. House of Representatives from Maryland's 7th congressional district 1841–1843 | Succeeded by seat abolished |
| Preceded by Joseph Stewart Cottman | Member of the U.S. House of Representatives from Maryland's 6th congressional district 1853–1855 | Succeeded by Thomas Fielder Bowie |
