= John Campbell (1765–1828) =

American politician

John Campbell (September 11, 1765 – June 23, 1828) was a United States representative from Maryland. Born near Port Tobacco, he studied law and was admitted to the bar and practiced. He held several local offices and was a member of the Maryland State Senate for three years.

Campbell was elected as a Federalist to the Seventh and to the four succeeding Congresses, serving from March 4, 1801, to March 3, 1811. He was judge of the orphans’ court of Charles County. He died at "Charleston" farm, in Charles County; interment was in the private burying ground on the estate of Daniel Jenifer.

U.S. House of Representatives
Preceded by George Dent	Member of the U.S. House of Representatives from Maryland's 1st congressional district 1801 - 1811	Succeeded by Philip Stuart
