= Accokeek =

Accokeek, Algonquin for "at the edge of the hill", may refer to:

== Maryland ==
- Accokeek, Maryland, a census-designated place south of Washington
- Accokeek people, an Indigenous people of Maryland, along with the Piscataway
- Accokeek Creek Site, an archeological site there
- Accokeek Road (Maryland Route 373) in Prince George's County

== Virginia ==
- Accokeek Creek, about 25 miles southwest of Accokeek, MD
- Accokeek (plantation), the 17th-century plantation of George Mason I
- Accokeek Furnace Archeological Site, 1726-1753, iron furnace near the head of Accokeek Creek

== Other ==
- USS Accokeek (ATA-181), a U.S. Navy ship
