= Crow's Nest Natural Area Preserve =

Protected area in Virginia, United States

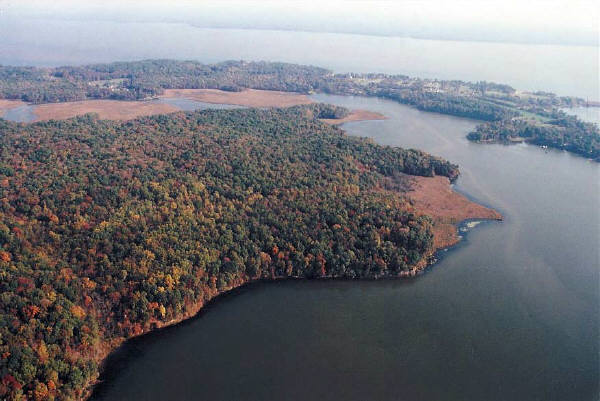
- Crow's Nest Point looking northeast

- Location within Northern Virginia Location within Virginia Location within the United States
- Location: Stafford County, Virginia, US
- Nearest city: Fredericksburg
- Coordinates: 38°22′N 77°20′W
- Area: 3,115 acres (12.61 km^{2})
- Established: 2009
- Owner: Stafford County

Crow's Nest Natural Area Preserve is a large wilderness area located on the southern border of Stafford County, Virginia, United States, between Potomac Creek and Accokeek Creek. The greater portion of the Crow's Nest Peninsula is approximately 3,800 acres (15 km^{2}) and lies within the coastal plain of Virginia. About 3,115 acres (12.61 km^{2}) of the peninsula is protected as part of the Virginia Natural Area Preserve System. Funding for the original two tracts came from a number of sources including DCR, Stafford County, Virginia Department of Environmental Quality and a number other sources.

Virtually the entire Crow's Nest Peninsula is forested with an impressive, mature stand of mixed hardwoods. Hardwood forests of this extent are becoming increasingly rare in the Virginia and Chesapeake Bay coastal plain due to prevalent forestry practices and fragmentation of natural areas for development and agriculture. The size and continuity of this hardwood stand enhance its viability and its value in providing a large, unfragmented natural area for diverse organisms. Within a relatively short time (50–100 years), this forest will also comprise a substantial occurrence of old-growth forest with inestimable scientific, biological, and aesthetic values. Currently, trees greater than two feet (60 cm) diameter at breast height (dbh) are common, and very large relict tree specimens are scattered throughout the site.

The entire Crow's Nest Peninsula is undeveloped and is primarily forested with mature stands of hardwood trees such as oaks and hickories. This is especially true in the eastern half of the peninsula and the northern slopes facing Accokeek Creek. The coastal plain landscape in this region of Virginia was formed beginning in the late Triassic period, approximately 230 million years ago, through the rise and fall of the sea. Crow's Nest is approximately 5 miles (8.0 km) in length from east to west, 1.5 miles (2.4 km) across and rises 160 feet (49 m) above the surrounding Accokeek and Potomac creeks. The peninsula is highly dissected on its north and south sides by steep ravines flowing into these two fresh-water tidal creeks. In contrast, most landscapes in the coastal plain of Virginia are relatively flat and/or gently rolling. Crow's Nest's dramatic rise to 160 feet (49 m) above Potomac and Accokeek creeks is startling compared to the adjacent peninsulas in Stafford County, such as Marlborough Point and Widewater Peninsula, which are relatively flat.

A large portion of Crow's Nest is composed of calcareous, or calcium-rich, soil layers from ocean or marine animals that once lived at the bottom of a vast inland sea. Most soils in the Piedmont and coastal plain of Virginia are not calcareous or limey and thus tend to be acidic. This calcareous soil strata within Potomac Creek is referred to as the Aquia Formation, which is 60 million years old. The Aquia Formation is found within a larger outcrop belt known as the Pamunkey Group, a sequence of Lower Tertiary (Paleocene-Eocene) sands and clays that formed in shallow marine environments beneath the western margin of the Atlantic Ocean. The Aquia Formation is composed of marine sediments that are dark green to gray-green, argillaceous, highly glauconitic, well sorted fine-to medium grained sand with shell beds up to 100 feet (30 m) in depth.

Today, shell-marl/calcareous ravine forests such as those at Crow's Nest are not common anywhere in the mid-Atlantic region. These plant communities are rare to this coastal plain ecosystem. There are two nutrient-rich plant communities associated with lime sands and localized shell concretions at Crow's Nest. One can be broadly classified as Basic Mesic Forests (G2, globally imperiled). Another rare community found at Crow's Nest that is typically associated with the shell-marl/calcareous environments is the Basic Oak-Hickory Forest (G2, globally imperiled). These are found on two very steep slopes facing Potomac Creek and represent this plant community.

Much of the shell-marl/calcareous ravine forests that do still exist on the east coast of the United States have since been heavily logged. In assessing natural communities in need of protection, the Virginia Department of Conservation and Recreation listed the state's few remaining calcareous ravine forests to be conservation priorities. The Crow's Nest site is perhaps Virginia's best remaining example of this rare forest community.

Due to the unusual subsurface calcareous soil formations underlying most of the peninsula, the unusual soils are basic (alkaline) and give rise to rare plants and plant communities. This is due to the ability of the limey soils at Crow's Nest to neutralize and buffer soil pH within the range 6.3 to 6.8. Elements such as calcium (Ca) and magnesium (Mg) create conditions in the soil that raise the pH of the soil and increase nutrient availability for plants. This results in the establishment of more robust and diverse vegetation at Crow's Nest. Additionally, disjunct plant communities at Crow's Nest are found that are not common in the Piedmont and coastal plain of Virginia, as these areas generally have lower pH soils. These rare or "disjunct" plants and plant communities include small-flower baby-blue-eyes (Nemophila aphylla) and glade fern (Athyrium pycnocarpon).

After assisting and conducting field surveys for rare plant species and plant communities, the Virginia Department of Conservation and Recreation, Division of Natural Heritage determined in 1999 that "Crow's Nest is considered one of the finest, if not the finest example of mature forests remaining in the Coastal Plain of Virginia." These forest communities on the peninsula consist of several distinct community types. The peninsula supports several regionally and globally rare plants and plant communities, two of which are ranked Globally Imperiled (G2) by NatureServe.

== Geologic history ==
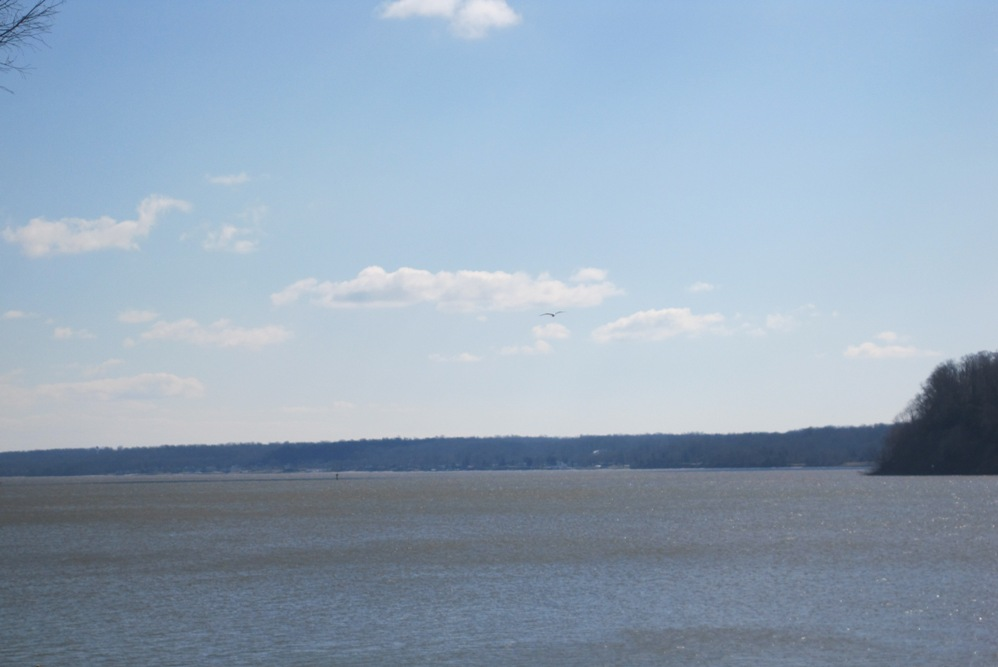
A view of Crow's Nest from across the Potomac River

The mid-Atlantic Ridge started to form in the early Jurassic period (175 million years ago), breaking apart the super continent Pangaea and beginning the expansion of the modern Atlantic Ocean. It has widened steadily to its present size. This rifting event separated North America from Africa, and the area known today as Virginia became the trailing edge of the newly formed North American continent. The Jurassic Period is found in the Mesozoic Era, or the Age of the Dinosaurs. The Mesozoic Era spanned a length of time from 251 million years ago to 66 million years ago.

In the early Eocene Epoch (55.8 million years ago) the Coastal Plain of Virginia was completely underwater. Sediment accumulating beneath this sea eventually would become the Crow's Nest of today. The Paleocene and the Eocene epochs are found in the Cenozoic Era, or the age of the mammals. The Cenozoic Era spanned a length of time from 66 million years ago to the present.

During the Eocene, the Atlantic Ocean was considerably narrower than it is today, making migration relatively easy for marine animals. The climate of Virginia during this period was considerably warmer than it is today. According to extensive records, the Earth experienced its warmest interval of the past 66 million years during the early Eocene, and Virginia was probably much warmer than central and southern Florida today. The remains of large alligators and turtles have been found at this latitude in Virginia.

The calcareous soil strata within Potomac Creek, the Aquia Formation, is 60 million years old. This formation is found within a larger outcrop belt known as the Pamunkey Group, a sequence of Lower Tertiary (Paleocene-Eocene, 55.8 million years ago) sands and clays that formed in shallow marine environments beneath the western margin of the Atlantic Ocean. The Aquia Formation is composed of marine sediments that are dark green to gray-green, argillaceous, highly glauconitic, well sorted, fine-to medium-grained sand with shell beds up to 100 feet (30 m) in depth.

== Biology ==
Crow's Nest has been referred to as a "biological gem". There have been few formal surveys for rare plant and animal species, however, mostly conducted by the Virginia Department of Conservation and Recreation in the late 1990s.

Virtually the entire 3,000 acres (12 km^{2}) Crow's Nest Peninsula is forested with mature stands of mixed hardwoods. In the words of Gary Fleming, Natural Heritage Program ecologist, "Overall, Crow's Nest supports one of the finest—if not the finest—upland hardwood forests remaining in the Virginia Coastal Plain." Surveys documented two state-listed species and the potential habitat for two other federal listed species and several state-listed species. Several Stafford County records for plants and two state-listed endangered plant species were found, including ginseng (Panax quinquefolius) in rich ravines and river bulrush (Scirpus fluviatilis) in adjacent tidal marshes. Suitable habitat was found for small whorled pogonia (Isotria medeoloides), although it does not grow there.

The peninsula is forested with huge trees, some over 4 feet (1.2 m) in diameter, including chinkapin oak (Quercus muhlenbergii) and tulip poplar (Liriodendron tulipifera). Other trees include bitternut hickory (Carya cordiformis), pignut hickory (Carya glabra), black walnut (Juglans nigra), and black locust (Robinia pseudoacacia).

In addition to the high-quality forests found at Crow's Nest, there are approximately 700 acres (2.8 km^{2}) of freshwater tidal marshes surrounding the peninsula that account for 60% of all marshes in Stafford County. The marshes are in nearly pristine condition and represent some of the best examples found in the state.

Several environmental factors exert important influences on vegetation on the Crow's Nest Peninsula. First, the steep terrain made most of the site unsuitable for agriculture, so it was never fragmented or plowed. It is one of the largest unfragmented patches of hardwood forests in Virginia's coastal plain. The steepness also limited logging to a substantial degree. Secondly, the mix of freshwater tidal wetlands, ravine bottoms, steep slopes of various aspect, and high ridge crests has led to a high biodiversity, including sites important in neotropical bird migration. Lastly, the Lower Tertiary deposits in this part of the mid-Atlantic Coastal Plain consist largely of glauconitic sand, shelly clay-silt, and some sandy limestone and calcium-rich sands. These contribute to the development of relatively basic, nutrient-rich soils. Basic or calcareous soil environments are uncommon to rare on the Virginia coastal plain and can support vegetation unusual for the region.

Crow's Nest is surrounded on three sides by a freshwater-tidal estuary, and a multitude of resident and spawning fish thrive in these waters. Local fishermen captured the shortnose sturgeon (Acipenser brevirostrum), a federally listed endangered fish, twice in 2002.

A variety of marine fossils have been found on the shores of Crow's Nest. These include Paleocene-epoch shark teeth, as well as ancient parts of rays, turtles, and numerous mollusks of genus Turritella. Turritella has an elongated, highly coiled corkscrew shape. The internal molds and casts of these gastropods can be found in these waters and are especially plentiful at nearby Bull Bluff on Potomac Creek.

Many of the calcareous ravine forests on the east coast of the United States have been logged, and the Virginia Department of Conservation listed this ecosystem as a conservation priority. The Crow's Nest site is one of Virginia's best remaining examples of this rare habitat and associated vegetation types. These communities are rare in the coastal plain ecosystem. The principal rich forest associated with ravines down-cutting into lime sands and localized shell concretions is currently classified as the Northern Coastal Plain/Piedmont Basic Mesic Hardwood Forest and is found on two dry, very steep slopes facing Potomac Creek.

More study is required for a better understanding of the environment and ecology at Crow's Nest. In the larger context of biodiversity protection in Virginia and the mid-Atlantic region, the factors which contribute to the unique character of this region and its important neotropical migrant populations include its size, large-patch community dynamics, its diversity of habitats, and the known or potential occurrence of rare ecosystems and biota.

== Native Americans ==
Crow's Nest Peninsula is steeped in important local, state and national history. Important events happened here, and important people lived extraordinary lives at Crow's Nest. Evidence of significant Native American, colonial, Civil War and modern history are found at Crow's Nest and the adjoining lands within the estuary of Potomac and Accokeek creeks.

=== Native peoples in the region ===
The archaeological record reveals that native peoples have been in this area of the coastal plain of Virginia since the Early Archaic period, around 9000 BC. It was thought that due to the steep topography at Crow's Nest the Patawomecks may not have lived in permanent villages adjacent to the surrounding water, though they definitely hunted and camped there. In October 2005, Cultural Resources Inc. (CRI) conducted a Phase I archaeological resource inventory of Crow's Nest and found archaeological evidence of several Late Woodland domestic occupations associated with hamlets or villages. In one area of Crow's Nest, a large number of unfinished stone points were found, indicating that Indians had once used the property as a stone-tool-making workshop.

Directly across the mouth of Accokeek Creek from Crow's Nest Point there are the archaeological remains of a Patawomeck Indian town at Indian Point on the Marlborough Point Peninsula's western tip. "Patawomeke Town" was a community of the Patawomeck tribe for which the Potomac River is named. There are several different spellings for the native people who inhabited this area. ("Patawomeck" will be used in this article.) The original pronunciation may never be known. This area of Potomac Creek and the Potomac River is a boundary between three major Late Woodland Period Indian groups, Iroquoian-speaking people to the north, Siouan-speaking people to the western Piedmont, and Algonquian-speaking people on Potomac Creek. The name Patawomeck name may mean "trading place". It is certainly true that Potomac Creek Ware is iconic to the region and has a wide distribution, found hundreds of miles from its place of origin.

One of the most endangered archaeological sites in Virginia, the remains of a large 13th-century and 13-ringed palisaded Indian community was found next to Indian Point, nationally catalogued as 44ST2. Today, small pieces of cord-impressed Potomac Creek Ware pottery continue to be found along the shoreline. Radiocarbon dates on carbonized wood at this site have established that the town was occupied between 1300 AD and 1550 AD. The latter dates suggest that this particular town was not inhabited by the post-contact period in the 17th century, and that a neighboring village site (44ST1) at Indian Point had replaced it by then. John Smith encountered the Patawomecks in 1608. Indian Point is believed to be where Pocahontas, Powhatan's daughter, was captured by Captain Samuel Argall in 1613. Relatively peaceful relations between the English and Patawomecks continued from 1608 to 1619. Captain Samuel Argall with his ship Discovery sailed into Potomac Creek and gained nearly 400 bushels of corn, peas and beans and many furs in 1610. It is believed that trade with the Patawomecks increased the chances of Jamestown Colony surviving the first ten years. The Patawomecks did not fight against the English in the first Indian war led by Opchanacanough against the English in March 1622. By the summer of 1622 documentation exists that a Captain Madyson tragically turned on the Patawomeck tribe, killing 30–40 and burning a village.

By the 1670s English homesteads dotted the Potomac River shores far past Potomac Creek. There was a gradual abandonment of the Patawomeck homelands, with the people primarily going to live among other Algonquian-speakers, including the Potopacos (Portobago Bay on the Rappahannock River to the south. The Potomac Neck area was patented to John Rookwood and later to Giles Brent in 1651. The last chief of the Patawomecks, Wahanganoche, was alleged to be murdered in Caroline County, Virginia, in 1664. Historical records show that the Patawomecks ceased to exist as an organized society after the late 17th century. In her book Pocahontas’s People, Helen Roundtree states that "No patent mentions the site of the Patawomeck town and no documents mention the Patawomecks at all after 1665."

Frank Speck, author of Chapters on the Ethnology of the Powhatan Tribes of Virgini, believed that a small group of families, whose names are mostly Newton and Green, represent what may be the residue of the Indians who are recorded to have inhabited Potomac Creek. Speck estimates their number back in the 1920s to be about 150.

The records of the people who were descendants to the Patawomecks were largely destroyed during the Civil War. Additionally, it may not have been popular in the 18th and 19th centuries to claim Indian ancestry due to the racial attitudes that existed then. This may be one of the reasons that state recognition of the Patawomecks as an Indian tribe is difficult to achieve. Nevertheless, in the 1990s, the descendant community of the native peoples of Potomac Creek reorganized as the "Patawomeck Tribe" and conduct regular tribal events and powwows in Stafford County. The Patawomeck received official recognition from the Commonwealth of Virginia in February 2010.

== Civil War ==
Not much is known about Crow's Nest's direct involvement during the American Civil War except for the burning of the Daniel homes and their eviction from Crow's Nest. Due to its close proximity to well-documented military sites and activities, Crow's Nest undoubtedly harbored Union forces at the time. According to D.P. Newton of Stafford County and curator of the White Oak Museum in Stafford, a brigade of Union troops held ground at Crow's Nest. Stafford County is situated halfway between the capitals of the Union and Confederacy during the Civil War and thus became a large depot for important campaigns in Fredericksburg, Spotsylvania County, and Orange County. According to the National Park Service, "the area around Fredericksburg has the most blood-soaked ground than anywhere in America." The battles of Fredericksburg, Wilderness, Chancellorsville, and Spotsylvania Courthouse were fought within a 20-mile (32 km) radius all south of Crow's Nest.

Eric Mink, historian with the Fredericksburg and Spotsylvania National Military Park, interprets the following events surrounding Crow's Nest in south Stafford: "With Virginia's secession from the Union in April 1861, Stafford County quickly became part of the frontier between the warring sections of the country. The nearness of the Potomac River caused immense concern among Confederate authorities, as the idea of large flotillas of Union gunboats descending the Potomac resulted in panic among Virginia residents. In May 1861, Confederate forces moved into Stafford County and erected batteries along the Potomac shore. The idea was to create a blockade of the river that would neither allow warships to descend the river, nor allow supply ships up to Alexandria and Washington, D.C. The defenses also helped to protect the northern terminus of the Richmond, Fredericksburg & Potomac Railroad, located at Aquia Creek Landing. Artillery positions were established at the mouth of Aquia Creek and even on Marlborough Point. The Potomac batteries harassed Yankee shipping throughout the winter of 1861 and 1862."

Because of its location on the Potomac River and its proximity to Fredericksburg, Aquia Landing was destined to play an important role in the Civil War. It was the site of one of the war's earliest military engagements and became a major supply base for the Union's Army of the Potomac in three separate campaigns. On May 31, 1861, there was the first engagement of the Civil War between the U.S. Navy and the shore batteries of the Confederacy at Aquia Landing.

In the spring of 1862, the war shifted south toward Richmond, and the Confederates abandoned the Potomac River defenses. As fate would have it, Crow's Nest would be in the wake of the northern Armies of the Potomac that would occupy south Stafford. Since 1854, the terminus of the Richmond, Fredericksburg, and Potomac Railroad (RF&P) had been located at Aquia Landing, where travelers transferred to steamships to complete their journey to Washington, D.C. Subsequently, Federal armies arrived en masse in southern Stafford County in 1862. Aquia Landing and Belle Plains, directly across from Crow's Nest, immediately became critical junctions for moving men and material southward. Potomac Creek became a major off-loading and depot for tens of thousands of men engaged in fighting the major campaigns in the Fredericksburg area.

While the war played out around Richmond, Federals in Stafford County acted as a barrier or shield for Washington, D.C. The Potomac River became the lifeline for the Federals in Stafford. Supplies steamed down the river and to Aquia Creek Landing. The Federal occupation lasted through the spring and summer, before developments around Manassas forced the evacuation of Stafford in September 1862. Prior to their withdrawal, Union forces destroyed the railroad tracks and burned down the depot buildings at Aquia Landing.

U.S. troops returned to Stafford County in November 1862. During the Fredericksburg and Chancellorsville campaigns, from November 1862 through June 1863, southern Stafford County was occupied by more than 100,000 troops of the Army of the Potomac. Once again the Potomac River was alive with ships and transports, bringing supplies, food and equipment. More landings opened to handle the steamers and barges. Aquia Creek Landing was rebuilt and again became very busy, as were wharves at Belle Plains, Hope Landing and Marlborough Point. Hospitals grew up around these landings, as battle casualties and sickness took its toll on the Union army. Throughout southern Stafford County, winter camps sprang up, and the occupation of the area changed its appearance. Wood lots fell to the soldiers' axes, and small huts covered once-farmed fields. Almost certainly, the area known as Crow's Nest felt the intrusion of war, given its close proximity to Belle Plains and the shipping lanes. It is likely that camps and hospitals were established there, although documentation of these sites remains scant. In June 1863, the military activities shifted elsewhere, and once again the Union army abandoned Stafford County. Their return did not come until May 1864.

The spring of 1864 saw a renewed Union offense in Virginia. In the central part of the state, the Army of the Potomac drove into the heart of Spotsylvania County. The battles of the Wilderness and Spotsylvania Court House produced horrific casualties, as well as prisoners. Wounded Union soldiers and Confederate prisoners, destined for the hospitals and prisons in the north, were transported once again to the base at Belle Plains. A large prison holding area along the south side of Potomac Creek became known as the "Punch Bowl". Thousands of southern soldiers were held there while they awaited transportation north. Across the creek, on the Crow's Nest peninsula, wartime maps show that the captors set up artillery positions to cover the prisoners. As the war shifted south, once again Stafford County was left to its inhabitants. They felt the intrusion of the Union army only once more, when in June 1865 the victorious forces of the United States marched through the county on their way home to Washington, D.C.

Stafford County was devastated by the Federal occupation. The great conflict left south Stafford County barren and almost completely devoid of trees, food, forage and homes. Many homes were burned, and the population of Stafford County was greatly reduced. The northern troops destroyed hundreds of homes, and those that remained were severely damaged. The countryside was denuded of vegetation, and agricultural fields were trampled and reduced to over-ground patches of wild shrubbery.

The Daniel family of Crows Nest did not fare well during the Civil War period. As previously stated, going back to March 1857, Supreme Court Justice Peter Vivian Daniel was a part of an overwhelming majority of the Court who decided Dred Scott should be returned to slavery in the infamous Dred Scott Decision of 1857. He served on the Court until his death in 1860. Although Moncure Daniel Conway, one of the most famous Southern abolitionists at the time, was related to the Daniel family, Stafford County was Confederate territory, and the inhabitants of Crow's Nest were considered southern sympathizers. According to Raleigh Travers Daniel, whose father was born at Crow's Nest, "the northern armies forced the evacuation of the family home and the house was fired upon."

According to Jerrilynn Eby: "As the marauding Union soldiers streamed onto the tract in 1862, the family loaded a wagon with what they could carry and fled towards Fredericksburg. While crossing the Rappahannock River, the wagon overturned and all their belongings were lost. Back at Crow's Nest, the Union soldiers ransacked the house, carrying off whatever they wished. Because it offered such a fine vantage point of the creek, the soldiers set fire to the house, thus preventing its use by Confederates. When the family finally returned to Crow's Nest, all that remained was a small table out in the yard. Some soldier had carried it out of the house, perhaps decided it was too large to take with him, and dropped it in the yard. It was the family's only household possession that survived the war. By the 1920s another house had been built on the tract, this one standing in the approximate center of the peninsula."

Additionally, Eby states, "During the War Between the States, the Crow was used for blockade running, much to the dismay of the Union. Northern gunboats finally cornered the Crow and her crew in Potomac Creek. Had they captured the ship, the Crow would have been confiscated for use by the invading forces. Realizing that the situation was hopeless, the captain of the Crow ordered the crew to raise all sails and attain maximum speed. Rather than lose his ship to the Union cause, the captain ran her aground on the sand bar off Marlborough Point, crushing the hull. The crew then waded ashore and disappeared into the safety of the Stafford forest. The ribs of the ship remained near the shoreline well into the 20th century."

After the death of John Moncure Daniel III in 1865, the remarkable history of Crow's Nest seems to have come to an abrupt end as the Daniel family was forcefully evicted from the property in the 1860s and the inhabitants of the peninsula were gone.

== See also ==
- List of Virginia Natural Area Preserves
