= George Mason I =

English politician in Virginia (born 1629)

Member of the Virginia House of Burgesses representing Stafford County
- In office 1676–1677 Serving with Thomas Mathew
- Preceded by: Henry Meese
- Succeeded by: William Fitzhugh
- In office 1680–1682 Serving with William Fitzhugh
- Preceded by: n/a
- Succeeded by: Martin Scarlett
- In office 1684–1685 Serving with William Fitzhugh
- Preceded by: Martin Scarlett
- Succeeded by: Martin Scarlett

Personal details
- Born: 5 June 1629 Pershore, England
- Died: 1686 (aged 56–57) Stafford County, Colony of Virginia
- Resting place: Accokeek, Stafford County, Virginia
- Spouse(s): Mary French; Margaret Allerton; Frances Norgrave
- Relations: great-grandfather of George Mason IV
- Children: George Mason II
- Occupation: planter, soldier, legislator, justice of the peace

George Mason I (5 June 1629 – 1686) was the English born progenitor of the prominent Virginian landholding and political Mason family. Mason was the great-grandfather of George Mason IV, a Founding Father of the United States.

== Early life ==
George Mason was born in Pershore, England, on 5 June 1629. He was the third of seven children of yeoman farmer Thomas Mason and his wife Ann French. The French family were well connected through their relations to the Greys of Powis, through whom they and thus the American Masons descended from Antigone of Gloucester, an illegitimate granddaughter of Henry IV. George Mason was christened at Pershore Abbey, Holy Cross Church, Pershore, Worcestershire, on 10 June 1629.

== Royalist in England ==
George Mason I was a Cavalier during the reign of Charles I of England, like his father Thomas Mason, who opposed Charles I's execution in 1649. With the rank of captain, Mason commanded a troop of horse in Charles II's army. After Oliver Cromwell led the parliamentary-funded troops to victory over the Masons and other Royalist forces at the Battle of Worcester in 1651, George and younger brother William Mason hurriedly left England.

== Career in Virginia ==
The ancestral Masons probably arrived at Norfolk, Virginia on the ship Assurance in 1652. In addition to his younger brother William, Mason emigrated with cousins and neighbors from England, Thomas and Gerrard Fowke of Staffordshire. Mason settled in then-vast Westmoreland County in the early 1650s. In 1664 he helped to name Stafford County when increasing population in the area led the Virginia General Assembly and royal governor to form it from Westmoreland County.

=== Planter ===
This first George Mason eventually settled permanently near an Indian village along Accokeek Creek on a hill between present-day State Routes 608 (Brooke Road) and 621 (Marlborough Point Road) in Stafford County. He grew tobacco using a labor force of indentured servants. Mason named his residence Accokeek, but after the tribe disappeared from the area, the Mason family rechristened it "Rose Hill". The property was named for the Accokeek tribe which inhabited both sides of the Potomac River (and despite later wars and disease some individuals remained in present-day Prince George's County, Maryland through the Revolutionary War area). Accokeek plantation began as 650 acres (2.6 km^{2}) and gradually increased to 1,150 acres (4.7 km^{2}) in size.

=== Politician and military officer ===
Mason's political career may have been delayed by a Jamestown commission charged with investigating a complaint by Wahanganoche, a Patawomeck Indian chief, whom Captain Giles Brent captured in March 1661/1662 and charged with killing an Englishman. An investigatory commission in Jamestown fully exonerated Wahanganoche, finding him framed for the murder. They also fined Colonel Gerrard Fowke ten thousand pounds of tobacco for allowing the real murderer to escape, and ordered Brent to pay Wahanganoche 200 arms lengths of wampum (which they called "roanoke"). The commission also ordered Colonel Fowke, Captain Mason and Mr. John Lord to pay the chief 100 arms lengths apiece. However, Wahanganoche died in 1663, not long after returning from Jamestown, so the commission's declaring all the other men ineligible to hold public office had little effect (voters in then-vast Westmoreland County elected Fowke as one of the burgesses representing them in 1663 and 1665).

In 1670, Mason won election as Stafford county's (second) sheriff and five years later was selected as the county lieutenant, an important military position in light of raids by Native Americans as well as the Dutch, who had nearly captured Jamestown (the colony's capital) in 1667. Mason continued to lead the local militia as an officer, eventually earning the honorific colonel.

In July 1675, Robert Hen, a herdsman who was an indentured servant of fellow planter Thomas Mathew was found dying near his cabin by parishioners gathering for church. A dead Doeg warrior nearby and his final words "Doeg" seemed to implicate the Doeg (a/k/a Dogue), an Algonquin-speaking tribe whose main village had been on what had been called Doeg or Dogue Neck, but which is now known as Mason Neck after this man's descendants acquired the land from the Fowke family. The Doegs had resented Mathew for cheating them and not paying for some beaverskins, and had attempted to steal some hogs, hence the fatal skirmish. At Mathew's behest, Mason and Brent's nephew Captain George Brent led the initial Stafford County militia response. Militiamen surrounded cabins and murdered at least ten peaceable Indians before Mason realized the mistake and ordered the militia to stand down in what became a prelude to Bacon's Rebellion the following year, and expulsion of most native peoples from the coastal region.

In 1676 after Governor Berkeley called for elections and in part because former burgess Henry Meese (1665–1669) returned to England, fellow settlers elected Mason and Matthew to represent Stafford county (part time) in the House of Burgesses, the lower house of the Virginia General Assembly. However, the following year, neither won re-election, and Stafford county was represented by only William Fitzhugh for several years. In 1680, the House of Burgesses was expanded, and voters elected Mason to serve alongside Fitzhugh, though Mason would die in 1686 and his son would win election and re-election many times (including alongside George Brent in 1688 as well as many times alongside Fitzhugh and his son). The first George Mason in Virginia thus began traditions of land ownership (including of indentured servants and later enslaved people) and of political leadership.

Mason also served as Stafford County's as a Justice of the Peace and vestryman of the local parish of the Church of England. The Acts of the Assembly for 1675, 1679, and 1684, mention Colonel Mason as actively engaged in defending his frontier county against the Indians.

== Marriage and children ==
Mason married Mary French in 1658. He and Mary had one son:

- George Mason II (1660–1716)

Mason married secondly to Margaret Allerton in Stafford County, Virginia in 1661. They had 3 sons:

- Isaac Mason (1661–1689)
- Richard Mason (1662–1693)
- William Mason (1663–1686)

Mason married thirdly to the newly widowed Mary French Norgrave in 1669 in Stafford County, Virginia. They had one daughter, Sarah E. Mason, born in 1672. The widow, who had brought with her 300 acres from her marriage to Captain John Norgrove (d. 1669), would marry again, to Dr. Edward Maddox, who owned considerable land in King George County and would serve as a Stafford County justice of the peace from 1691 until at least 1693.

== Death and legacy ==
Mason died in 1686. His body was interred in 1686 on a hillside at Accokeek in Stafford County, Virginia. His gravesite is currently unmarked. His son, George Mason II soon sold the Accokeek plantation and built one along Chopawamsic Creek, as well as continued to acquire land on both sides of the Potomac River.

== Masonvale ==
George Mason University, named in honor of Mason's great-grandson, re-established its Naming Committee to research and select names for its campus facilities and infrastructure. The committee agreed upon the name "Masonvale" for its faculty and staff housing community in the northeast section of George Mason University's Fairfax Campus. The appendage of "vale" was derived from George Mason I's birthplace, Pershore, which lies in an agricultural region known as the Vale of Evesham in Worcestershire, England. To unify the naming theme within Masonvale, the names "Pershore" and "Evesham" were then used as street names for the community. Other street names used are "Bredon Hill," "Cotswolds Hill," and "Staffordshire." All are regions of Old Worcestershire where many of Mason's ancestors once resided.
