= Thomas Mathew (burgess) =

Merchant and politician of The Colony of Virginia

- Born: England
- Died: February 1706; London, England
- Resting place: St Dunstan-in-the-East, London
- Occupation: Merchant
- Notable work: The Beginning, Progress, and Conclusion of Bacon's Rebellion (1705)
- Children: John, Thomas Jr., and Anna
- Relatives: Capt. John Cralle and Robert Walton (brothers in law)

Member of the House of Burgesses for Stafford County
- Incumbent
- Assumed office 1676 Serving with George Mason I
- Succeeded by: William Fitzhugh

Thomas Mathew (d. 1706) was an English merchant who became a planter and politician in the Colony of Virginia. He owned property in Northumberland County and was one of the first burgesses representing Stafford County in the House of Burgesses when it was formed. An Indian raid which killed one of his herdsmen was a precursor of Bacon's Rebellion and (shortly before his death in London) Mathew wrote an account of that conflict which was published a century later.

== Early and family life ==
Mathew had a merchant brother John in London, who later named him as a beneficiary of his estate. It is unclear whether that brother was the John Mathews who witnessed at least one land patent in Northumberland county in 1651 which was acknowledged in the local court in 1655. Also given variant spellings of the day, his relationship with Governor Samuel Mathews, who deeded tracts of 300 acres and three of 1000 acres in Northumberland County (later Westmoreland County) bordering the Potomac River in 1657 is likewise unclear, and Governor Mathews had a grandson named John Mathews who was underage in 1671 and who later became a burgess representing Warwick County far to the south in 1680-1682.

== Career ==
By the 1660s, Mathew had clearly become a maritime merchant and acquired several tracts of land in then-vast Northumberland County, including 600 acres in 1663 for importing himself (several times), his son Thomas Mathew Junior and four named dower Black individuals. The first Virginia document Thomas Mathews witnessed in Northumberland County was a debt claim for a Maryland merchant in March 1656. In 1655 Mathews patented another 200 acres for importing two more named indentured servants, although one of those men soon tried to escape with four Black persons so the local court extended his indenture term by two and a half years. A document from March 1664 referred to Mathew's store at Great Wicomoco, and in 1672 the county court granted him permission to erect a mill at the head of the Great Wicomico River or one of its branches. In 1679/80 Mathew patented 3,800 acres for importing 10 Black individuals from Barbados as well as 3 from New England, (as well as himself and his namesake son again) and 60 named people (including the 1665 attempted escapee).

Years later in his last will and testament Mathew referred to himself as "formerly of Cherry Point, in the parish of Bowtracy, Northumberland County, Va." Cherry Point Neck is near Lottsburg in Northumberland County. During his tenure in Virginia, Westmoreland County (including much of Bowtracy parish, which survived for less than a century) was split from Northumberland County, and Stafford County was split from Westmoreland County. Complicating matters, when the Virginia General Assembly authorized 10 forts for defense against Indian raiders in 1671, it specified that the Stafford County Fort be "at or near John Mathews on Potomack River" and named the garrison as 34 men from Lancaster County and 25 men from Middlesex County, commanded by Captain Peter Knight. Only the fort four miles south of Fredericksburg had a larger garrison, but the precise location of the Stafford fort was still unknown in 1976. It was presumed north of Aquia Creek, and Col. George Mason (I) and Mr. James Austin were to choose the men and horses and also ensure a supply of trade cloth to reward the services of friendly Indians.

In the intervening decades, Mathew often sought the local Northumberland court's assistance in establishing the age of children indentured to him. He also obtained a judgment against a female servant for having a bastard child. In 1669, a servant filed a complaint that he was being given base jobs, although his indenture was to train him as a merchant. In 1683 and 1685 (by which time Mathew was one of the members of the county court, as discussed below), indentured servants successfully sued Mathew for holding them beyond their terms.

Meanwhile, in July 1675, Doeg warriors attempted to steal hogs from Mathew's farm because he had not paid them for some beaverskins. A skirmish occurred, and in addition to at least one Doeg warrior killed, Mathew's herdsman Robert Hen was mortally wounded, but survived long enough to identify his attackers as Doeg. In response, Mathews enlisted the Stafford County militia, who responded under Col. George Mason I and Capt. George Brent. The militia attacked two cabins occupied by Indians, killing at least fourteen before Mason identified the occupants as friendly Susquehannocks and not Doegs, and called off the slaughter. In September, Governor William Berkeley of Virginia and Maryland's governor jointly sent a thousand men against a newly constructed Susquehannock fort in Maryland, the Virginians now led by Col. John Washington and the Marylanders by Major Thomas Trueman. After the natives sent five leaders to parley under a flag of truce and displaying tokens from Maryland's proprietor, colonial soldiers brought the corpses of some of those killed and demanded Indians be killed in revenge. Trueman then allowed his men to murder the emissaries despite his previous promises. The siege continued for approximately six weeks (and about 50 colonials died) before the natives escaped at night. Trueman was later impeached by Maryland's legislature, but convicted only on one of three charges, and his penalty later reduced. Meanwhile, Susquehannock warriors raided in both Maryland and Virginia in revenge, and killed colonists, including an indentured servant of Nathaniel Bacon, who gathered militia to seek revenge.

By 1674, Mathew had lent money to Jamestown tavernkeeper Richard Lawrence, who would become one of Nathaniel Bacon's chief lieutenants in Bacon's Rebellion two years later. Early in the conflict, Lawrence or other members of Bacon's faction approached Mathew, who went to Col. George Mason I for advice.

In mid-1676, Governor Berkeley finally called for new legislative elections, and Stafford County voters elected Mathew and Mason as their representatives to the House of Burgesses. In that era, because of transportation difficulties to the capital in Jamestown, burgesses need not live in the counties they represented, but could have a financial interest in land in the county they represented.

On February 10, 1677, shortly after Bacon's death and the capture or surrender of many of his followers, Mathew was one of the men specifically exempted from the general pardon that King Charles and his emissaries ordered Governor William Berkeley to issue, and he was ordered to appear in court. In November 1678, following Governor Berkeley's departure and death in England, Governor Herbert Jeffreys confirmed Mathew's patent for 300 acres at Cherry Point Neck, together with several other men. By 1679, Mathew had been appointed as a justice of the peace for Northumberland County, and he continued in that role until 1682, when he became a justice of the peace for Old Rappahannock County, notwithstanding a censure in 1680 for failing to send the required number of men to the garrison at the headwaters of the Potomac River. Mathew also served as Northumberland County sheriff in 1681, and in 1684 received a bonus from Virginia officials (intent on fostering home manufacturing of cloth) for producing 35 yards of serge, 27.5 yards of woolen cloth and 76 yards of fine linen. When Mathew's will was filed in Northumberland County in August 1712, it expressly gave his brother in law Capt. Cralle and his faithful servant James Genn the right to live in houses on his Northumberland County, Virginia land, and also expressly mentioned Stafford County land to be divided among his children.

== Death and legacy ==
Mathew returned to England after Bacon's Rebellion ended, perhaps in part because he was among those specifically exempted from Governor William Berkeley's version of the general pardon urged by King Charles II, although Berkeley had been recalled to England and died there shortly after his arrival. Mathew lived in the parish of St. Margaret, Westminster in London.

In 1705, nearly thirty years after the rebellion, at the urging of then Britain's Secretary of State Robert Harley, Mathew wrote The Beginning, Progress, and Conclusion of Bacon's Rebellion, which survives. It was first published nearly a century after it was filed, as an American bought the manuscript and gave it to President Thomas Jefferson, who had long been fascinated by the rebellion as a precursor of the American Revolutionary War, and who sent a copy to his mentor George Wythe with permission to publish it. Accordingly, the Richmond Enquirer published a version over three days in September 1804, and the manuscript survives today in the collection of the Library of Congress (which makes a digitized version available). However, critics noted frequent factual errors, and characterized narrator Mathew as in part responsible for the conflict.

His will dated May 6, 1703 was recorded in the probate court of Canterbury on February 28, 1706, the date of his burial. The will divided Mathew's property in England and Virginia among his sons John and Thomas Jr, and daughter Anna, and requested that he be buried beside his son William in the "Church of St. Dunstan's in the East." In 1712, the same will was admitted to probate in Northumberland County, Virginia, by Mathew's brother in law, Capt. John Cralle. The Virginia file also contained a power of attorney dated January 3, 1737 from his sons (merchant John Mathew of London and Thomas Mathew of Sherbon Lane in London) to Thomas Compton of Maryland which allowed sale of those Northumberland County lands. The church was destroyed in World War II and is now a park, so Mathew's grave is unmarked.
