= George Mason II =

Virginian planter and officeholder (1660–1716)

Member of the Virginia House of Burgesses representing Stafford County
- In office 1705–1712 Serving with William Fitzhugh, John Waugh
- Preceded by: Rice Hooe
- Succeeded by: Henry Fitzhugh
- In office 1693–1703 Serving with William Fitzhugh, Thomas Ousley, Martin Scarlet, John Withers, Rice Hooe, John Waugh
- Preceded by: Martin Scarlet
- Succeeded by: Rice Hooe
- In office 1688–1691 Serving with George Brent, Martin Scarlet
- Preceded by: Martin Scarlet
- Succeeded by: John Withers

Personal details
- Born: George Mason; 1660 Accokeek, Colony of Virginia, British America
- Died: 1716 (aged 55–56) Port Tobacco, Province of Maryland, British America
- Resting place: Accokeek, Virginia, United States
- Spouses: Mary Fowke (m. 1688; died 1704); Elizabeth Waugh (m. 1706; died 1707); Sarah Taliaferro (m. 1710)
- Relations: Mason family
- Children: 12, including George III
- Parents: George Mason I; Mary French Mason
- Relatives: George Mason (grandson)
- Occupation: Planter; politician

Military service
- Allegiance: Great Britain
- Branch/service: Virginian militia
- Rank: Colonel
- Commands: Stafford County militia
- Battles/wars: American Indian Wars

George Mason II (1660–1716) was Virginian planter and officeholder who, although his father's only child, had many children and thus can be said to have established the Mason family as one of the First Families of Virginia. His grandson George Mason IV became the most distinguished member of the family, a Founding Father of the United States.

== Early life ==
Mason was born in 1660 at his father's Accokeek plantation in Stafford County, Virginia. He was the only son of George Mason I and his first wife Mary French. He was the first of Virginia's Mason family to be born in British America.

== Political career ==
Like his father, Mason led the Stafford County militia, with the rank of colonel. After his father's death, he won election many times as one of Stafford County's two part-time delegates in the House of Burgesses (then the only house of the Virginia General Assembly). This George Mason also served as the county's sheriff and justice of the peace between 1699 and 1700. During this tenure Mason secured funds from the county to build what was probably Stafford's first jail in 1690. Also between 1699 and 1700, Mason was county lieutenant of Stafford County, under General Nicholson, and defended white settlers of the Potomac region against Native Americans.

== Business ventures ==
In 1691, the town of Marlborough was laid out on the same neck of land in the Potomac River that included Accokeek plantation. Mason received multiple lots in Marlborough and may have built a tavern there.

Mason sold Accokeek after his father's death and relocated to a plantation on Chopawamsic Creek which he named Chopawamsic. At Chopawamsic, Mason planted an orchard, grew tobacco, and raised sheep and cattle.

== Marriage and children ==
Mason married his cousin Mary Fowke, daughter of Gerard Fowke and Ann Thorogood, in 1688. The couple had the following children:

- Ann Fowke Mason Fitzhugh Darrell Smith
- Elizabeth Mason Roy
- George Mason III (1690–March 5, 1735)
- Nicholson Mason (1694–1715 or 1716)
- French Mason (1695–1748)
- Mary Mason Fitzhugh Strother (born circa 1700)
- Simpha Rosa Ann Field Mason Dinwiddie Bronaugh (1703–November 22, 1761)

Mason married secondly to Elizabeth Waugh in Stafford County, Virginia in 1706. George and Elizabeth had one daughter:

- Catherine Mason (June 21, 1707–June 15, 1750) - was married colonial lawyer John Mercer (1704–1768)

Mason married for a third time to Sarah Taliaferro, daughter of Francis Taliaferro and Elizabeth Catlett, in 1710. George and Sarah had four children:

- Gerard Mason
- Thomas Mason
- Francis Mason (born 1711)
- Sarah Mason (born 1715)

== Later life ==
Mason died in 1716 in Port Tobacco, Charles County, Maryland. He was interred on a hillside with his father near the site of the old Accokeek estate near Accokeek Creek in Stafford County, Virginia.
