= Henry FitzHugh =

Henry FitzHugh may refer to:

== Nobility ==
- Henry FitzHugh, 3rd Baron FitzHugh (c. 1363–1425), English administrator and diplomat
- Henry FitzHugh, 1st Baron FitzHugh (died 1356), Baron FitzHugh
- Henry FitzHugh, 5th Baron FitzHugh (c. 1429–1472), Baron FitzHugh

== Others ==
- Henry Fitzhugh (assemblyman) (1801–1866), American merchant and politician in New York
- Henry FitzHugh (MP), for Yorkshire (UK Parliament constituency)
- Henry Fitzhugh (burgess) (1706–1742), Virginia planter, burgess
- Henry Fitzhugh (sheriff) (1687–1758), Virginia planter, sheriff and burgess, uncle of Henry Fitzhugh (burgess)
