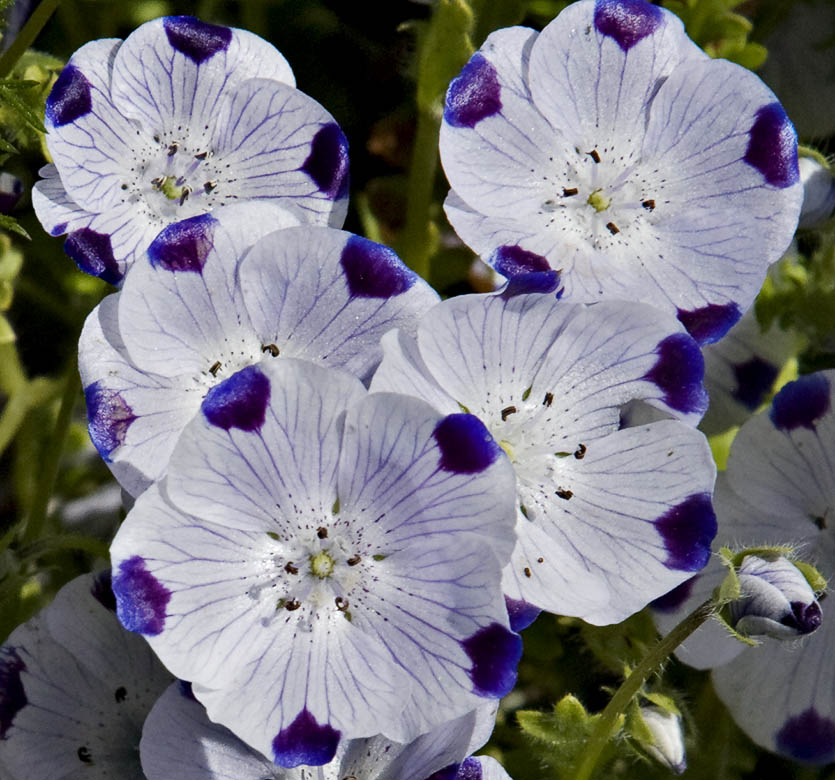

Scientific classification
- Kingdom: Plantae
- Clade: Tracheophytes
- Clade: Angiosperms
- Clade: Eudicots
- Clade: Asterids
- Order: Boraginales
- Family: Hydrophyllaceae
- Genus: Nemophila
- Species: N. maculata

Binomial name
- Nemophila maculata Benth. ex Lindl.

= Nemophila maculata =

Species of flowering plant

Nemophila maculata is a species of flowering plant, commonly known as fivespot. The genus Nemophila is placed in the family Hydrophyllaceae.

== Distribution ==
The wildflower is found on slopes in elevations between 20–1,000 metres (66–3,281 ft). The plant is endemic to California. It is most common in the Sierra Nevada, Sacramento Valley, and the California Coast Ranges in the San Francisco Bay Area.

It is found in several plant communities, including valley grassland, foothill woodland, and pine and fir forest.

== Description ==
Nemophila maculata is an annual herb that flowers in the spring. The leaves are up to 3 centimeters long and 1.5 wide, and are divided into several smooth or toothed lobes.

The flowers are bowl-shaped, white with dark veins and dots. The lobe tips are purple-spotted. The corolla is 1 to 2 centimeters long and up to 5 centimeters wide. The flowers' spots, giving the common name fivespot, attracts its primary pollinators, which are solitary bees. Male and female bees feed on the nectar and females collect pollen to feed their larvae.

The seeds are greenish-brown and are smooth or shallowly pitted. The fruit produces up to 12 seeds. The entire fruiting and seed cycle begins in spring and ends in the summer.

== Cultivation ==
Nemophila maculata is sown as an annual ornamental plant in traditional, native plant, and pollinator/wildlife gardens. It grows in loose, evenly moist, and well-drained soils. It requires full sun to part shade and will self seed in optimum growth conditions.
