= USS Accokeek =

Auxiliary ocean tug of the United States Navy

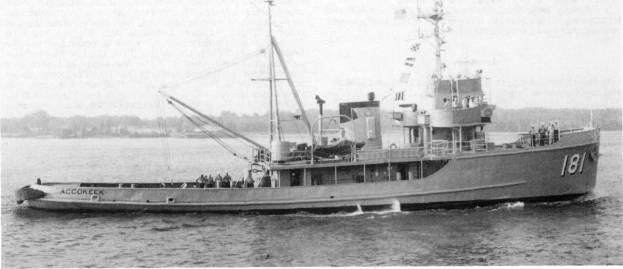
- USS Accokeek (ATA-181)

History

United States
- Name: USS ATA-181
- Ordered: 16 August 1943
- Builder: Levingston Shipbuilding, Orange, Texas
- Laid down: 15 June 1944
- Launched: 27 July 1944
- Commissioned: 7 October 1944
- Decommissioned: 29 June 1972
- Renamed: Accokeek, 16 July 1948
- Stricken: 31 March 1986
- Honors and awards: 1 battle star (World War II)
- Fate: Sunk as artificial reef, 20 February 1987

General characteristics
- Type: Sotoyomo-class auxiliary ocean tug
- Displacement: 835 long tons (848 t)
- Length: 143 ft (44 m)
- Beam: 33 ft 10 in (10.31 m)
- Draft: 13 ft 3 in (4.04 m)
- Speed: 13 knots (24 km/h; 15 mph)
- Complement: 5 officers, 44 enlisted
- Armament: 1 × 3 in (76 mm) gun; 2 × 20 mm guns

USS Accokeek (ATA-181) was an ATA-174 class auxiliary ocean tug in the service of the United States Navy, named after the Accokeek tribe of Native Americans.

She was laid down as the unnamed ATA-181 on 15 June 1944 at Orange, Texas by Levingston Shipbuilding, launched on 27 July 1944, and commissioned on 7 October 1944.

== Service history ==
=== World War II, 1944–1946 ===
After shakedown, she sailed for the Pacific Ocean, transiting the Panama Canal early in January 1945 and stopping in Hawaii in March. Resuming her voyage west, the tug arrived at Guam on 25 March, a week before the assault on Okinawa. For the rest of the war, ATA-181 aided warships damaged in that campaign, towing them from combat into Kerama Retto and thence to bases in the Marianas and in the Western Carolines.

She stayed in the Far East after the war providing towing and salvage support for the American occupation forces. On 15 October, a severe typhoon struck the anchorage at Okinawa and drove ATA-181 aground, but the tug escaped heavy damage and soon returned to duty. Her Far Eastern assignment ended early in the summer of 1946, and she began the long voyage to the east coast of the United States. Steaming via Pearl Harbor, San Francisco, and the Panama Canal, ATA-181 reached Philadelphia on 20 November.

=== Atlantic Fleet, 1946–1972 ===
Over the next 26 years, she carried out a variety of missions for the United States Atlantic Fleet. On 16 July 1948, she became Accokeek. While she operated most often along the eastern seaboard and in the West Indies, her work also took her to such widely separated locations as Labrador, Ascension Island, and even inland to Lake Michigan. Philadelphia served as her home port through most of her postwar career, but that changed on 30 June 1969 when Accokeek was reassigned to Little Creek, Virginia. The tug operated from that base for the remaining three years of her Navy service.

=== Decommissioning and disposal ===
Decommissioned at Norfolk Naval Shipyard on 29 June 1972, Accokeek was transferred to the Maritime Administration on 19 September 1972 for layup in its National Defense Reserve Fleet. On 31 March 1986, Accokeek was stricken from the Naval Vessel Register. She was sunk as an artificial reef in the Gulf of Mexico on 20 February 1987 and is a recreational dive site of the Florida Panhandle Shipwreck Trail

Wreck location: 29°58.475′N 85°51.915′W

== Awards ==
As ATA-181, Accokeek earned one battle star in World War II.

== Bibliography ==
Online resources

- wrecksite (28 July 2014). "USS Accokeek (ATA-181) (+1987)". Wrecksite.
