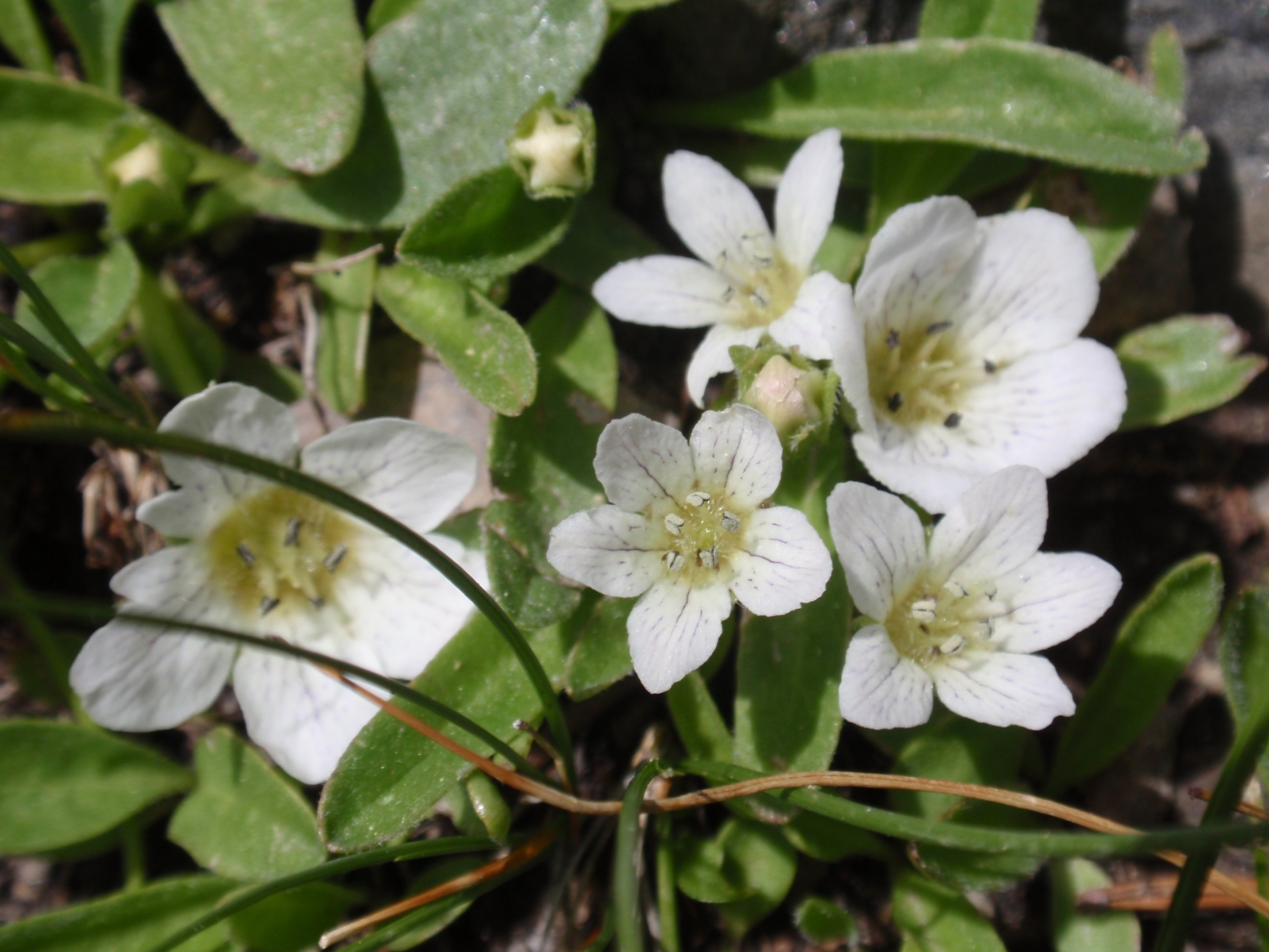

Scientific classification
- Kingdom: Plantae
- Clade: Tracheophytes
- Clade: Angiosperms
- Clade: Eudicots
- Clade: Asterids
- Order: Boraginales
- Family: Hydrophyllaceae
- Genus: Nemophila
- Species: N. spatulata

Binomial name
- Nemophila spatulata Coville

= Nemophila spatulata =

Species of flowering plant

Nemophila spatulata has common names Sierra baby blue-eyes and Sierra nemophila. The genus Nemophila is placed in the family Hydrophyllaceae.

== Distribution ==
The plant is an annual herb wildflower that grows in California, and adjacent areas of Nevada and Oregon.

It is found on slopes at elevations between 1,100–3,000 metres (3,600–9,800 ft), in meadows, road banks, and woodlands. It grows in the following plant communities:

- Yellow pine forest
- Red fir forest
- Lodgepole forest

Bioregional Distribution includes:

- Southern High Cascade Range
- High Sierra Nevada and Southern Sierra Nevada Foothills
- Tehachapi Mountains
- Transverse Ranges, in the San Bernardino Mountains and Santa Monica Mountains
- Peninsular Ranges in the San Jacinto Mountains

== Description ==
The flowers of Nemophila spatulata are bowl-shaped, white or blue and generally veined and dotted. The lobes are sometimes purple-spotted. The corolla is 2–8 mm long and 2–10 mm wide. The leaves are opposite, 5–30 mm long, and the petiole is winged. The lower blades have 3–5 lobes, are shallow and generally entire. The upper blade lobes have 3–5 triangular teeth.

The seeds are brown and are smooth but shallowly pitted. The fruit produces between 5-7 seeds.
