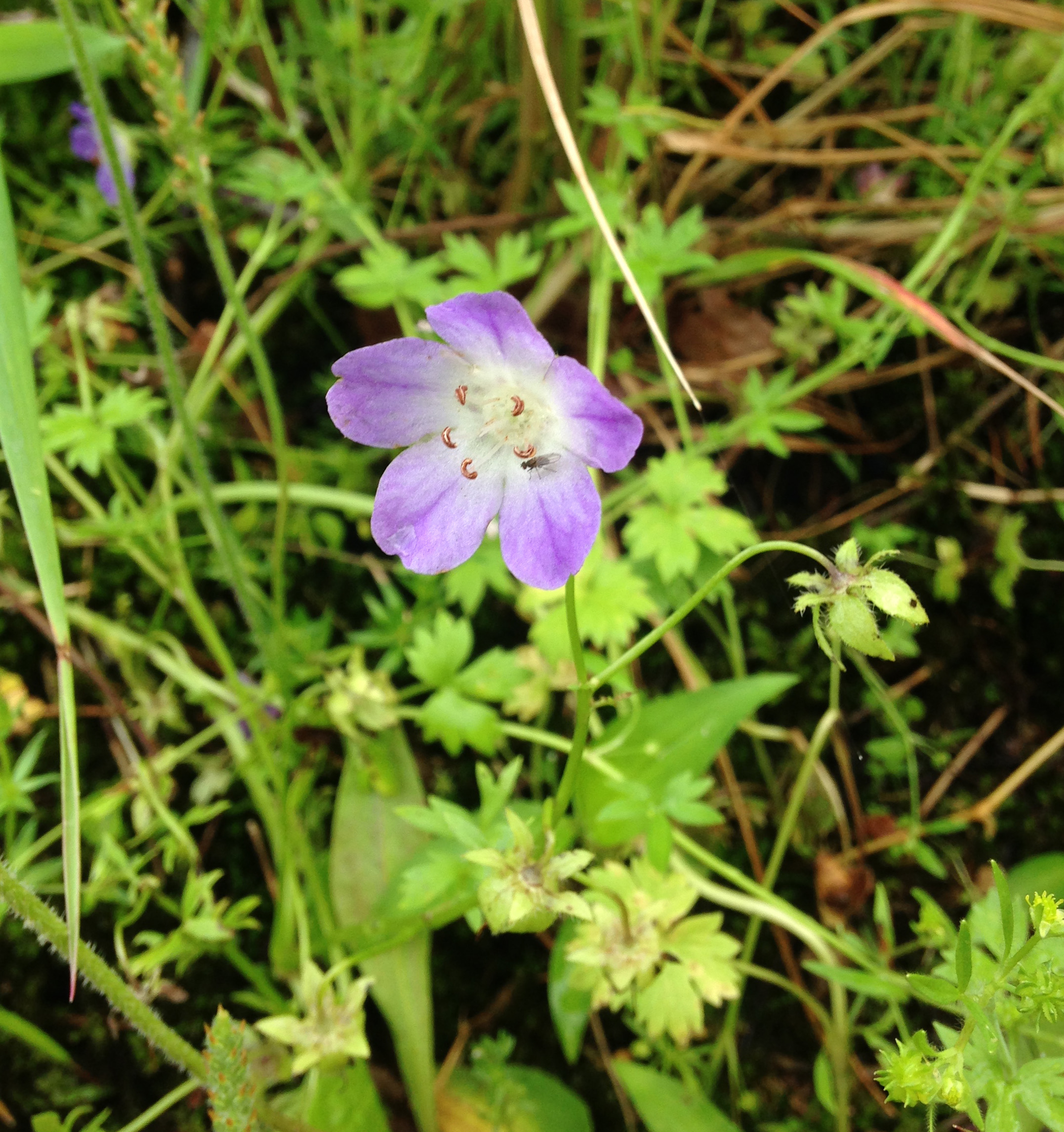

Scientific classification
- Kingdom: Plantae
- Clade: Tracheophytes
- Clade: Angiosperms
- Clade: Eudicots
- Clade: Asterids
- Order: Boraginales
- Family: Boraginaceae
- Genus: Nemophila
- Species: N. phacelioides

Binomial name
- Nemophila phacelioides Nutt.

= Nemophila phacelioides =

Texas baby blue eyes

Species of flowering plant

Nemophila phacelioides, commonly called large-flower baby-blue-eyes or Texas baby-blue-eyes, is a flowering plant in the waterleaf family (Hydrophyllaceae). It is native to the South Central United States, where it is found in Arkansas, Oklahoma, and Texas. Its natural habitat is in woodland openings in riparian bottoms, in sandy or silty soils.

== Description ==
Nemophila phacelioides is an herbaceous annual. It blooms in the spring, where it produces large showy flowers with a blue or purple outer edge, fading into white. The flowers are about an inch wide, and have five petals. The leaves of the plant are irregular, with about 7-10 teeth. The plant grows about 10 inches tall, and can often form a blanket cover over the ground.

== Cultivation ==
This plant performs well in the shade, and needs slightly moist soil. Baby Blue Eyes do well sown from seed, with about 12 inches of spacing. Seeds can be collected by tying a bag to the flower head.
