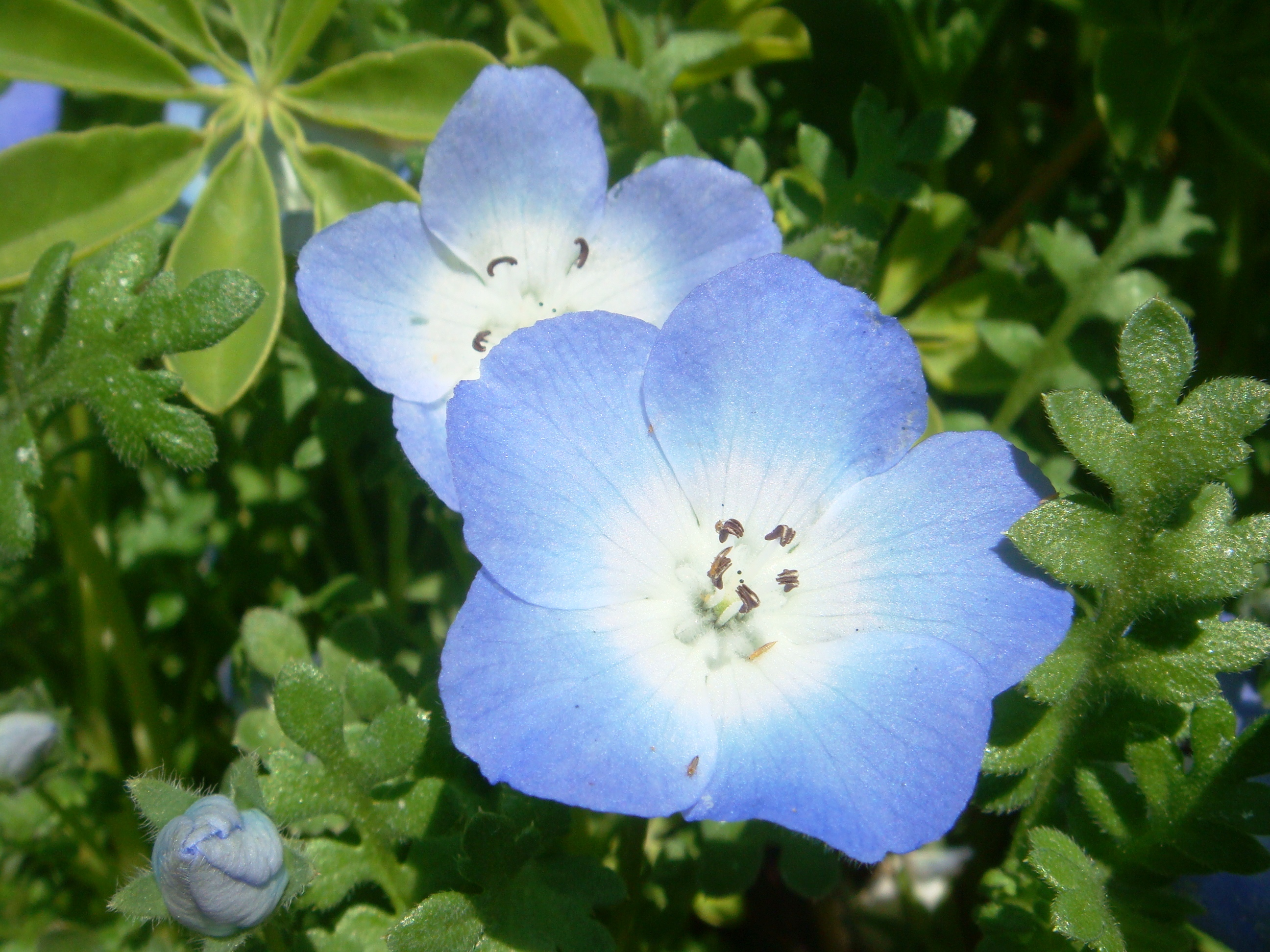
- baby blue eyes Nemophila menziesii

Scientific classification
- Kingdom: Plantae
- Clade: Tracheophytes
- Clade: Angiosperms
- Clade: Eudicots
- Clade: Asterids
- Order: Boraginales
- Family: Hydrophyllaceae
- Genus: Nemophila; Nutt.

Synonyms
- Anonymos Gronov. ex Kuntze; Erythrorhiza Michx.; Galax L.; Viticella Mitch.

= Nemophila =

Genus of flowering plants

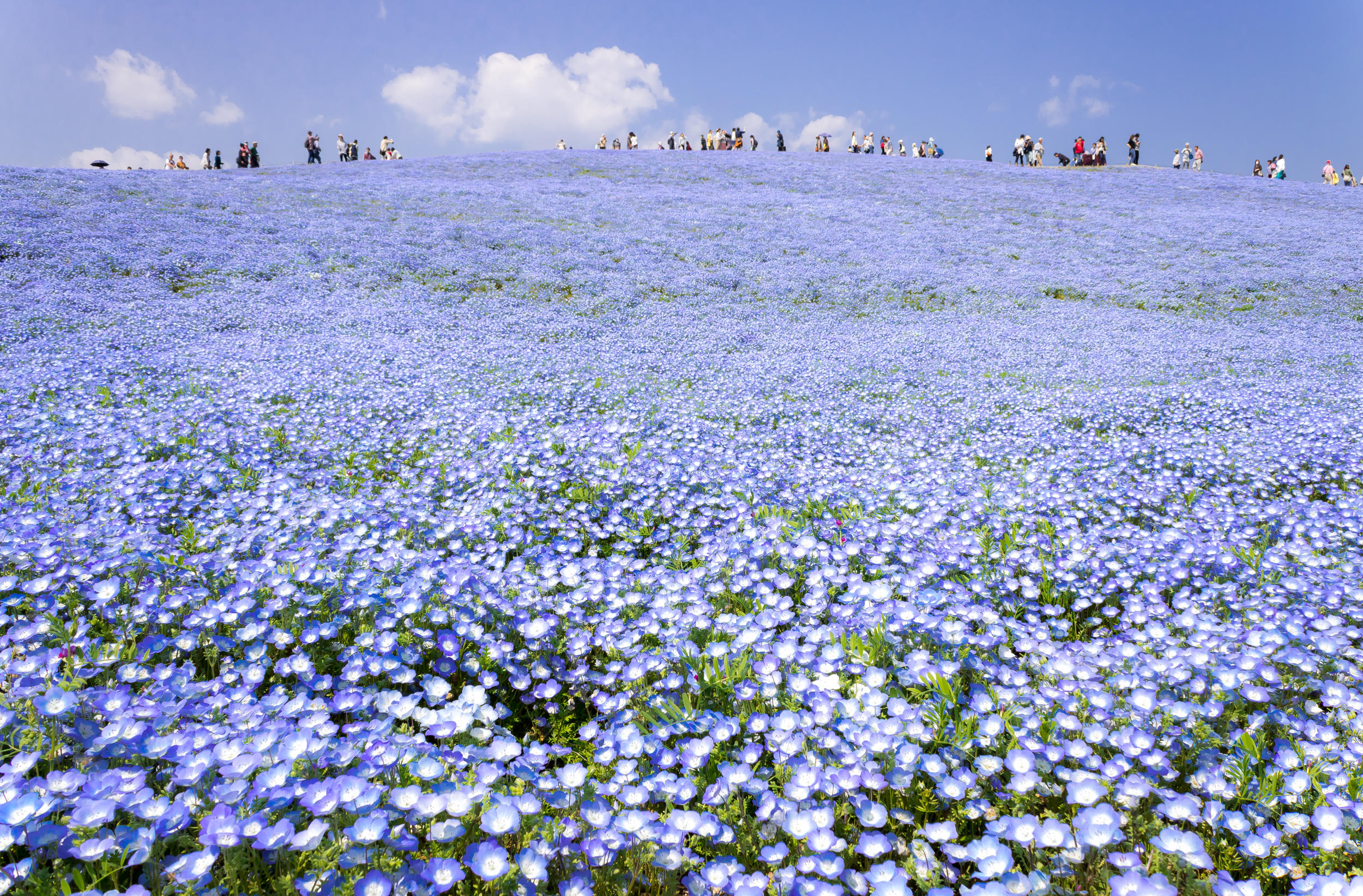
Nemophila at Hitachi Seaside Park

Nemophila is a genus found in the flowering plant family Hydrophyllaceae.

Most of the species in Nemophila contain the phrase "baby blue eyes" in their common names. N. menziesii has the common name of "baby blue eyes". N. parviflora is called the "smallflower baby blue-eyes" and N. spatulata is called the "Sierra baby blue eyes". An exception to this naming tendency is N. maculata, whose common name is fivespot.

Nemophila species are mainly native to the western United States, though some species are also found in Mexico, and in the southeastern United States. They are commonly offered for sale for garden cultivation. Generally these are Nemophila menziesii.

== Description ==
All species of Nemophila are annuals, and most bloom in the spring. Their flowers have five petals and are bell or cup-shaped, and purple, blue, or white in color, often spotted or marked. The stamens are included and there is only one ovary chamber.

The leaves are simple, with an opposite or alternate arrangement. The petiole is generally bristly. The leaf blade is pinnately toothed or lobed.

The fruit is 2–7 mm wide and generally enclosed by the calyx. The fruit itself is spherical to ovoid in shape. It is also hairy.

The seeds are ovoid, smooth, wrinkled or pitted. At one end there is a colorless, conic appendage.

== Occurrence ==
Generally the genus is native to United States of America, (they are found within the states of Alabama, Arkansas, California, Colorado, Delaware, Florida, Georgia, Idaho, Illinois, Kentucky, Louisiana, Maryland, Mississippi, Montana, Nevada, North Carolina, Oklahoma, Oregon, South Carolina, Tennessee, Texas, Utah, Virginia, Washington, West Virginia and Wyoming), Canada (they are found within the provinces of Alberta and British Columbia) and Mexico.

Some of the species of Nemophila are of restricted range. For example, Nemophila menziesii has been observed only in western North America, but chiefly in California. Nemophila heterophylla occurs in a more restricted range within northern and central California (with some proximate state populations); N. heterophylla has the greatest number of sightings in Marin County at locations such as Ring Mountain.

== Etymology ==
Nemophila means "woodland-loving", from the Greek words νέμος (némos) meaning wooded pasture, glade and philos, which means "loving".

== Species ==
There are 13 accepted species in Nemophila, according to Plants of the World Online, Kew.

- Nemophila aphylla (L.) Brummitt – smallflower baby blue eyes
- Nemophila breviflora A.Gray – Great Basin nemophila, Basin nemophila
- Nemophila heterophylla Fisch. & C.A.Mey. – Small baby blue eyes,
- Nemophila hoplandensis C.M.Barr
- Nemophila kirtleyi L.F.Hend. – Kirtley's nemophila
- Nemophila maculata Benth. ex Lindl. – Fivespot, five-spot
- Nemophila menziesii Hook. & Arn. – Baby blue eyes
- Nemophila parviflora Douglas ex Benth. – smallflower nemophila, small-flowered nemophila
- Nemophila pedunculata Douglas ex Benth. – littlefoot nemophila, meadow nemophila
- Nemophila phacelioides W.P.C.Barton – largeflower baby blue eyes
- Nemophila pulchella Eastw. – Eastwood's nemophila, Eastwood's baby blue eyes
- Nemophila sayersensis B.B.Simpson, Neff & Helfgott
- Nemophila spatulata Colville – Sierra nemophila, Sierra baby blue eyes

N. menziesii, N. parviflora, and N. pulchella have varieties under each species.
