= Nemophila breviflora =

Conservation status
- Secure (NatureServe)

Scientific classification
- Kingdom: Plantae
- Clade: Tracheophytes
- Clade: Angiosperms
- Clade: Eudicots
- Clade: Asterids
- Order: Boraginales
- Family: Hydrophyllaceae
- Genus: Nemophila
- Species: N. breviflora

Binomial name
- Nemophila breviflora A.Gray

Species of flowering plant

Nemophila breviflora is a species of flowering plant known by the common names basin nemophila, Great Basin nemophila, and Great Basin baby-blue-eyes. It is native to southwestern Canada and the northwestern United States, where it generally grows in wooded and forested areas in thickets and moist streambanks. The genus Nemophila is placed in the family Hydrophyllaceae.

It is an annual herb with a fleshy, somewhat prickly stem growing 10 to 30 centimeters tall. The alternately arranged leaves are divided into several wide, pointed lobes. Flowers are solitary, each on a short pedicel. The flower has a calyx of sepals each a few millimeters long, pointed, and edged with stiff hairs, and there are reflexed appendages between the sepals. The bell-shaped flower corolla is white or purple-tinged and a few millimeters wide. The fruit is a capsule which develops within the calyx of sepals and contains a single red, pitted seed.
