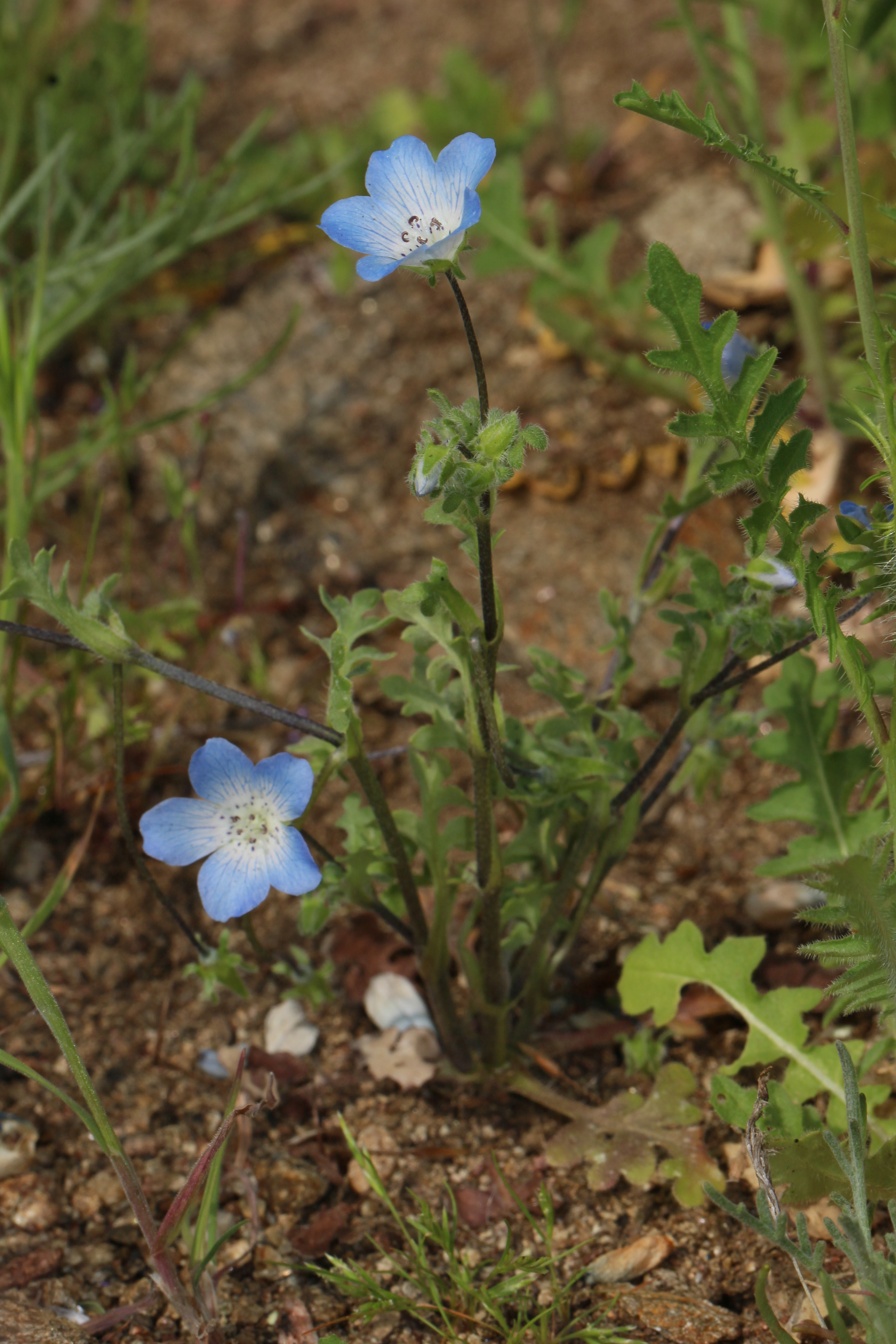

Scientific classification
- Kingdom: Plantae
- Clade: Tracheophytes
- Clade: Angiosperms
- Clade: Eudicots
- Clade: Asterids
- Order: Boraginales
- Family: Hydrophyllaceae
- Genus: Nemophila
- Species: N. menziesii

Binomial name
- Nemophila menziesii Hook. & Arn.

= Nemophila menziesii =

Baby blue eyes

Species of flowering plant

Nemophila menziesii, known commonly as baby blue eyes or baby's-blue-eyes, is an annual herb, native to western North America.

Historically, it was eaten by cows kept by the Kawaiisu.

== Distribution ==
The plant is native to California, Baja California, and Oregon.

It grows virtually throughout California at elevations from sea level up to almost 6,500 feet (2,000 m). It grows in many types of habitats, including chaparral, valley grasslands, and montane locales.

== Description ==
Nemophila menziesii is variable in appearance. Lower leaves are stalked, lobed and oppositely arranged, 10–50 millimetres (0.4–2.0 in) with five to thirteen lobes, each entire or with one to three teeth. Upper leaves are more or less sessile and less lobed than lower. The stalk of the inflorescence is 20–60 millimetres (0.8–2.4 in). Calyx lobes are 4–8 millimetres (0.2–0.3 in). The flower is blue with a white center or all white, usually with blue veins and black dots near the center. It is 6–40 millimetres (0.2–1.6 in) wide. The tube is less than or equal to the filaments.

=== Ecology ===
Germination of seeds for aggregates of Nemophila menziesii occurs in the Mediterranean climate of California and Oregon, which has a wet winter and a dry summer. Seeds usually sprout in late autumn or early winter when it is relatively warm and dry outside. Late spring and early autumn are too hot, it is too long a day, and there is little rain. The germination environments of the different populations are different; for example, plants from the north and high-altitude areas generally need a lower temperature and more water than those in warm, low-lying areas. Age of the seeds will also affect their germination; young seeds are more susceptible to high temperatures than old seeds.

=== Pollination and reproduction ===
Nemophila menziesii is self-compatible and protandrous; that is, the pollen-producing organs of the flower mature before the female reproductive organs. Separation of flowering time will alter the transfer mode of pollen inside and between flowers. Studies on floral variation have found that the shape of the corolla is relatively consistent in plants of different sizes. Experimental manipulation of corolla size and shape resulted in a relatively small change in pollination success; therefore, successful pollination can still occur with considerable variation in floral form. Therefore, some traits of flower shape may be relatively consistent among individuals, and other floral attributes differ significantly.

=== Seed biology ===
The characteristics of seeds in Nemophila menziesii are affected by both the maternal environment and genetic differences among plants. Plants in a greenhouse experiment that were in competition with the added grass Bromus diandrus produced smaller seeds than those without this competition. Due to competition, their germination time increase, dormancy period lengthened and the weight of growing seeds decreased. Based on the above results, the environment of the parent plant will affect some traits in the seeds it produces. The study also found maternal genetic effects on germination time and dormancy, and thus both genes and the environment are involved in the variation of seeds.

=== Varieties ===
The species includes three varieties:

- Nemophila menziesii var. atomaria has white flowers with black dots, often with a faint blue tint or blue veins in the corolla. It is found on coastal bluffs or grassy slopes in Oregon, Northwestern California, the Central Coast of California, and the San Francisco Bay Area.
- Nemophila menziesii var. integrifolia has blue flowers, with black dots at the center and deep blue veins. It is found in grasslands, canyons, woodlands, and slopes in the Central Coast, southern Coast Ranges, southwestern California, east of the Sierra Nevada range, and into the Mojave Desert and Baja California
- Nemophila menziesii var. menziesii has bright blue flowers with white centers that are generally dotted with black. It is found virtually throughout California, in meadows, grasslands, chaparral, woodlands, slopes, and desert washes, but it does not occur above 5,200 feet (1,600 meters).

== Cultivation ==
It is also cultivated as an ornamental plant, as annual wildflower in native plant, water conserving, traditional, and wildlife gardens.

It can occasionally be found outside its native range as an introduced species, such as in Alaska.

== Gallery ==
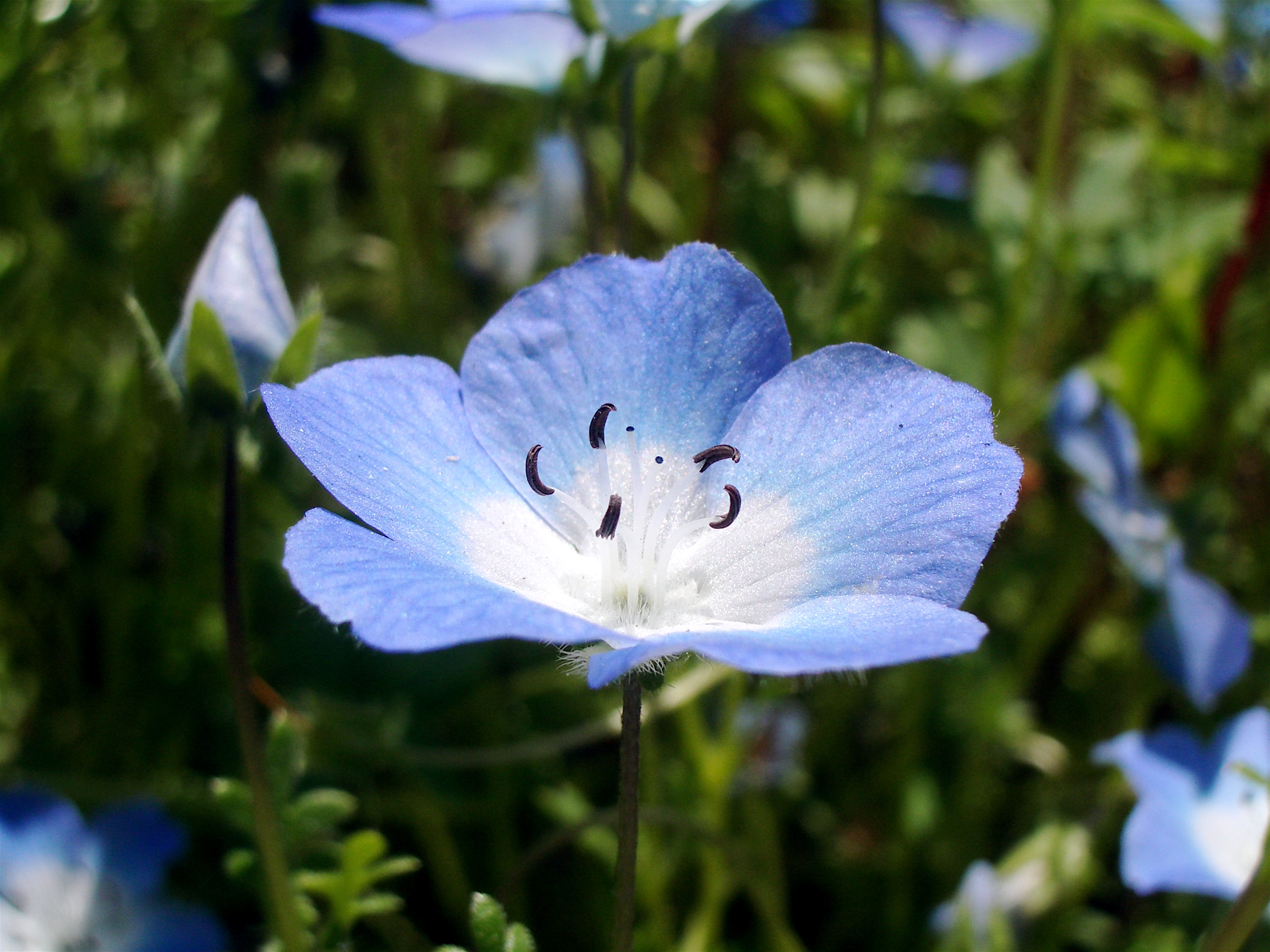
Location unknown

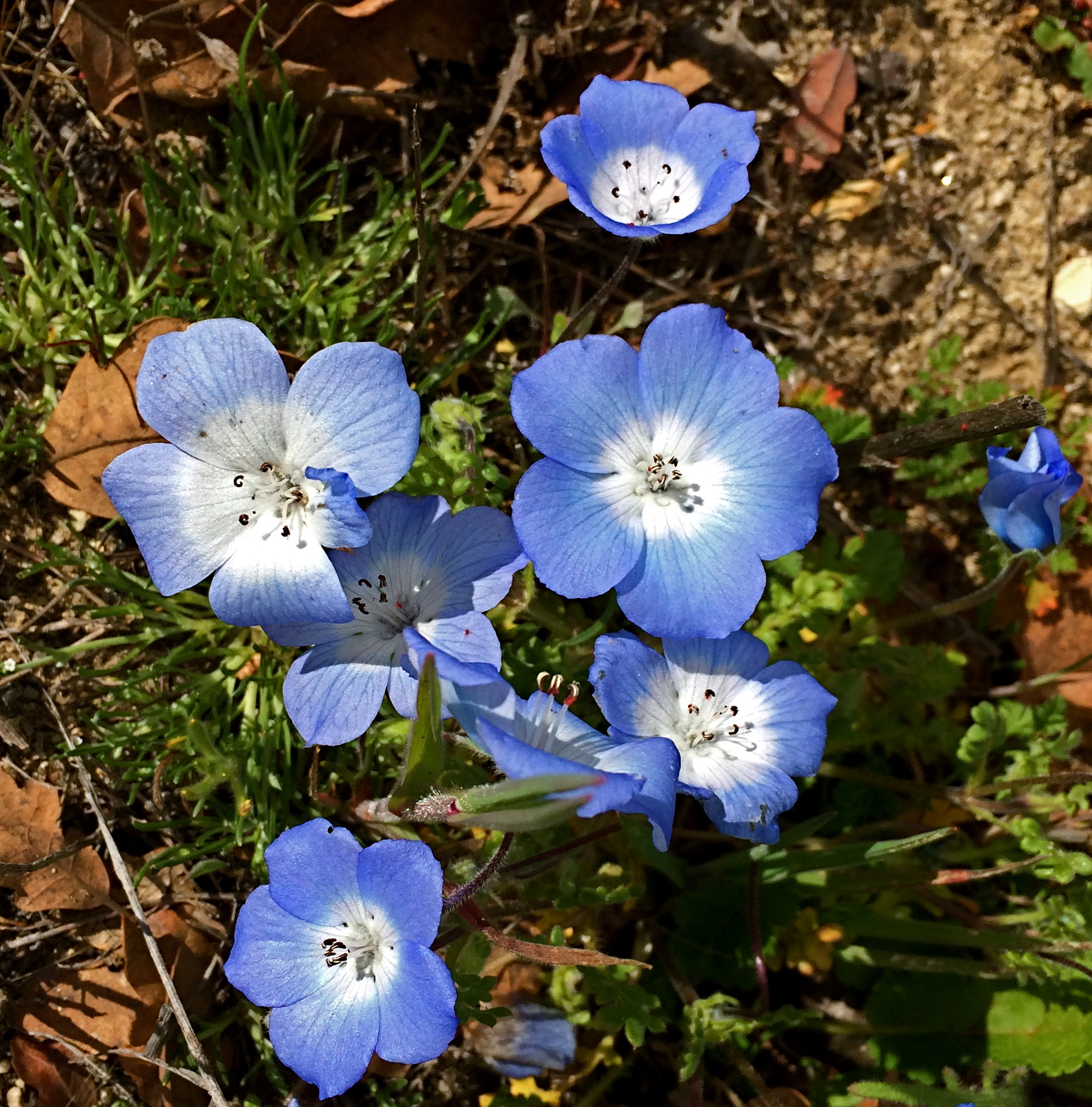
Baby blue-eyes, central SLO County, CA

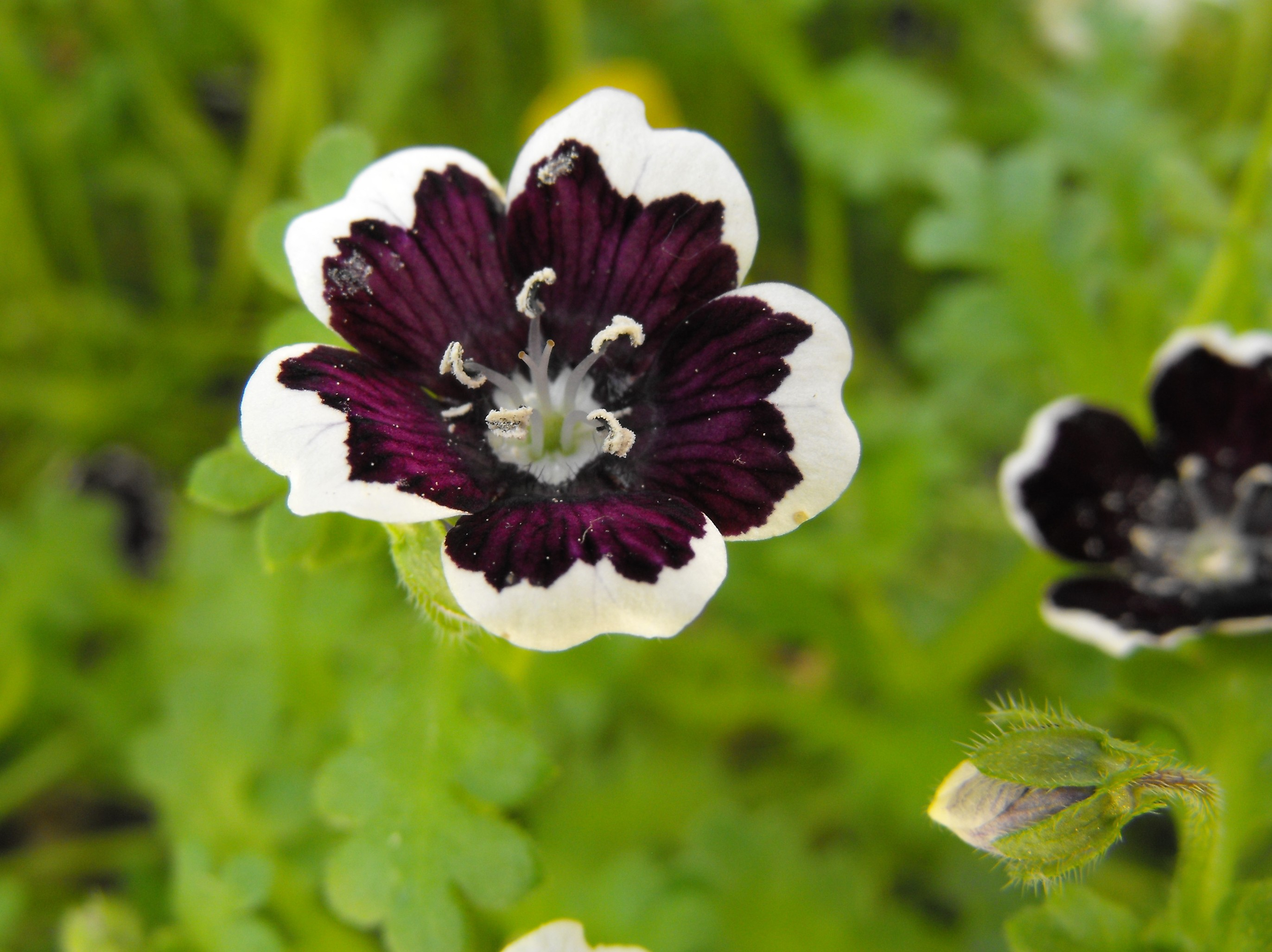
Nemophila menziesii 'Penny Black', Rancho Santa Ana Botanic Garden

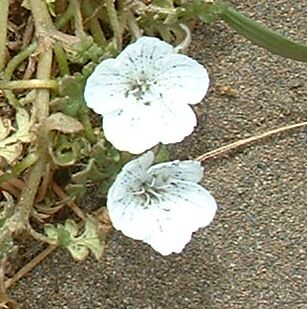
Nemophila menziesii var. atomaria

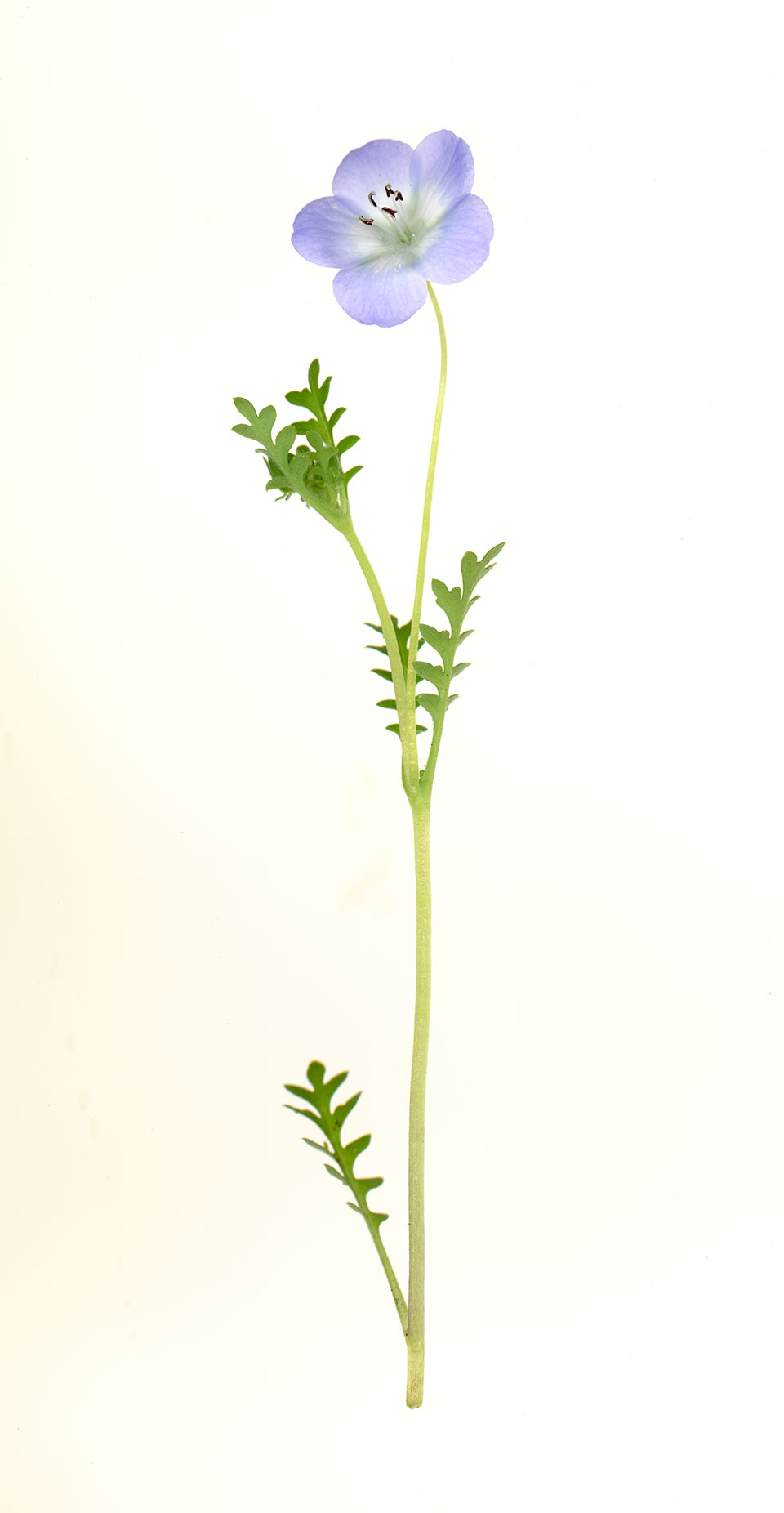
Baby Blue Eyes (Nemophila menziesii), scanography from San Diego, CA

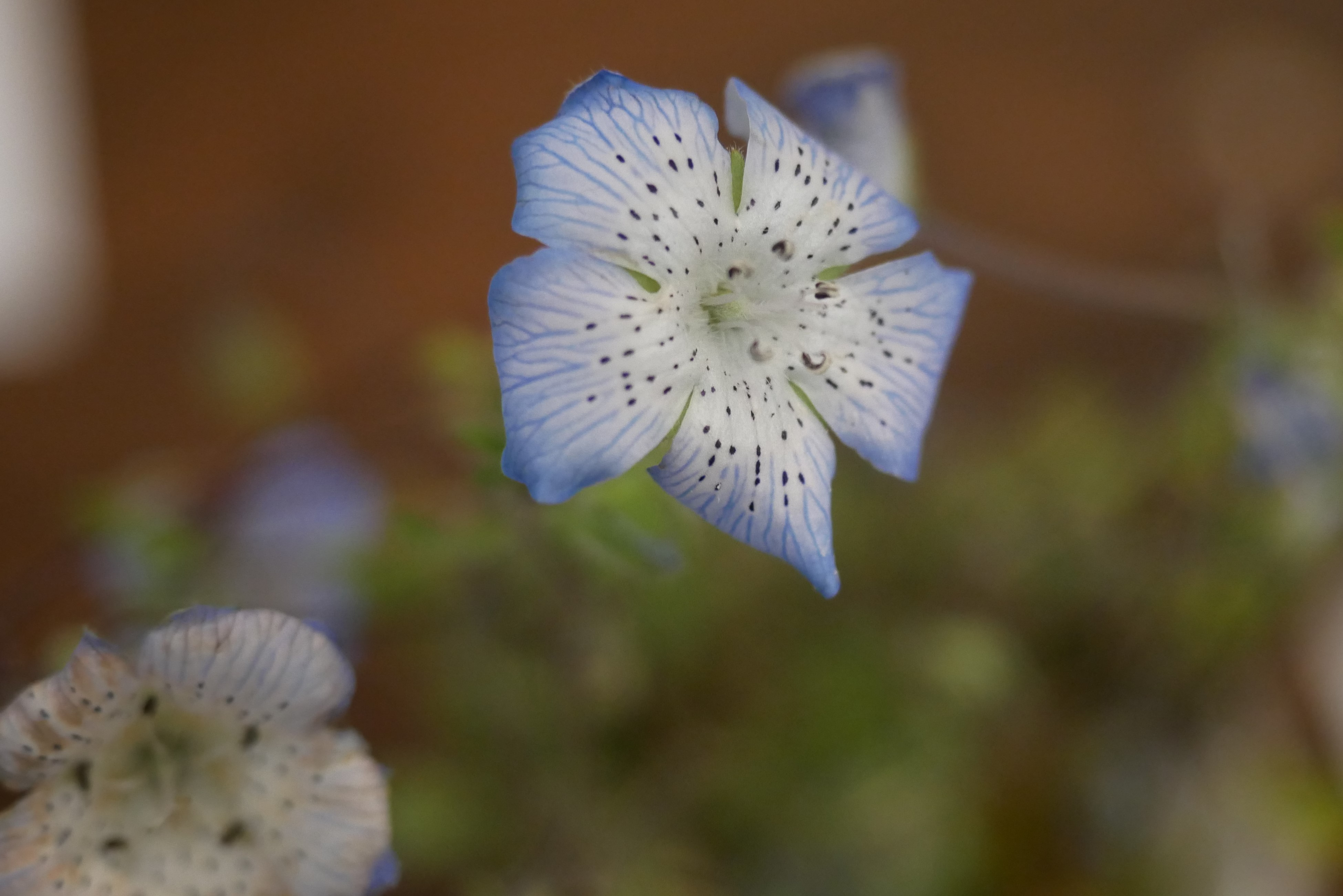
Nemophila menziesii var. integrifolia, close-up
