= Nemophila pulchella =

Nemophila pulchella Eastwood's baby blue-eyes

Scientific classification
- Kingdom: Plantae
- Clade: Tracheophytes
- Clade: Angiosperms
- Clade: Eudicots
- Clade: Asterids
- Order: Boraginales
- Family: Hydrophyllaceae
- Genus: Nemophila
- Species: N. pulchella

Binomial name
- Nemophila pulchella Eastw.

Species of flowering plant

Nemophila pulchella is a species of flowering plant known by the common name Eastwood's baby blue-eyes. It is endemic to California, where it is found from the San Francisco Bay Area to the southern Sierra Nevada to the Transverse Ranges. It grows in many types of mountain, foothill, and valley habitats. The genus Nemophila is placed in the family Hydrophyllaceae.

== Description ==
Nemophila pulchella is an annual herb with a fleshy and delicate stem. The leaves are up to 5 centimeters long and generally divided into five wide, rounded lobes. Flowers are solitary, each on a pedicel up to 3 centimeters in length. The flower has a calyx of hairy, pointed sepals. The bowl-shaped flower corolla is white or blue, the largest just over a centimeter wide.

There are three varieties.

- Frémont's baby blue-eyes, var. fremontii, has white flowers, as does
- var. gracilis, which is endemic to the Sierra Nevada foothills
- var. pulchella has blue flowers with white centers.
