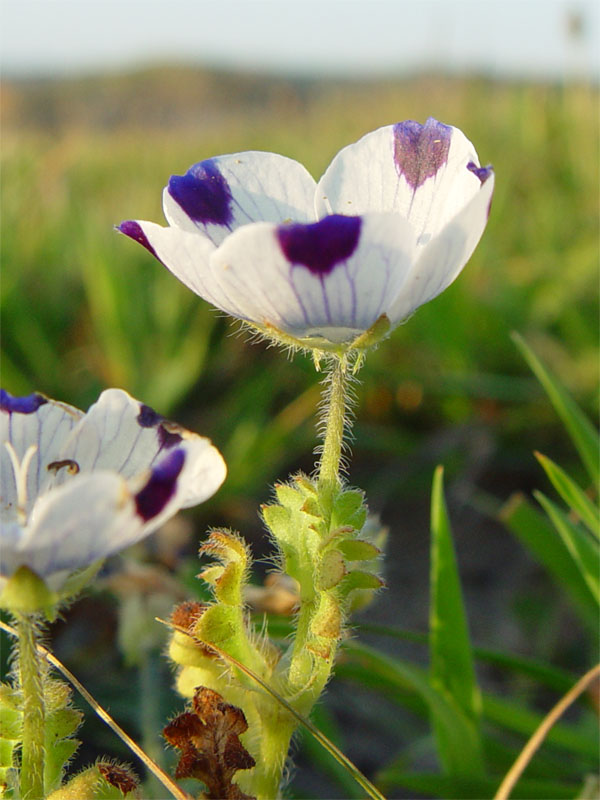

Scientific classification
- Kingdom: Plantae
- Clade: Tracheophytes
- Clade: Angiosperms
- Clade: Eudicots
- Clade: Asterids
- Order: Boraginales
- Family: Hydrophyllaceae
- Genus: Nemophila
- Species: N. pedunculata

Binomial name
- Nemophila pedunculata Dougl. ex Benth.

= Nemophila pedunculata =

Species of flowering plant

Nemophila pedunculata is a common annual wildflower found throughout western North America. Its common names include littlefoot nemophila and meadow nemophila.

Nemophila pedunculata grows low to the ground, with a fleshy stem and thick, bristly leaves. The flowers are tiny, only about a centimeter wide. They are a broad bell shape and they vary widely in color. Some are blue, but most are white with a variety of markings, including small blue streaks or speckles, or an eye-catching purple spot at the tip of each petal. Its native habitats include ocean bluffs, moist open places, and grasslands.
