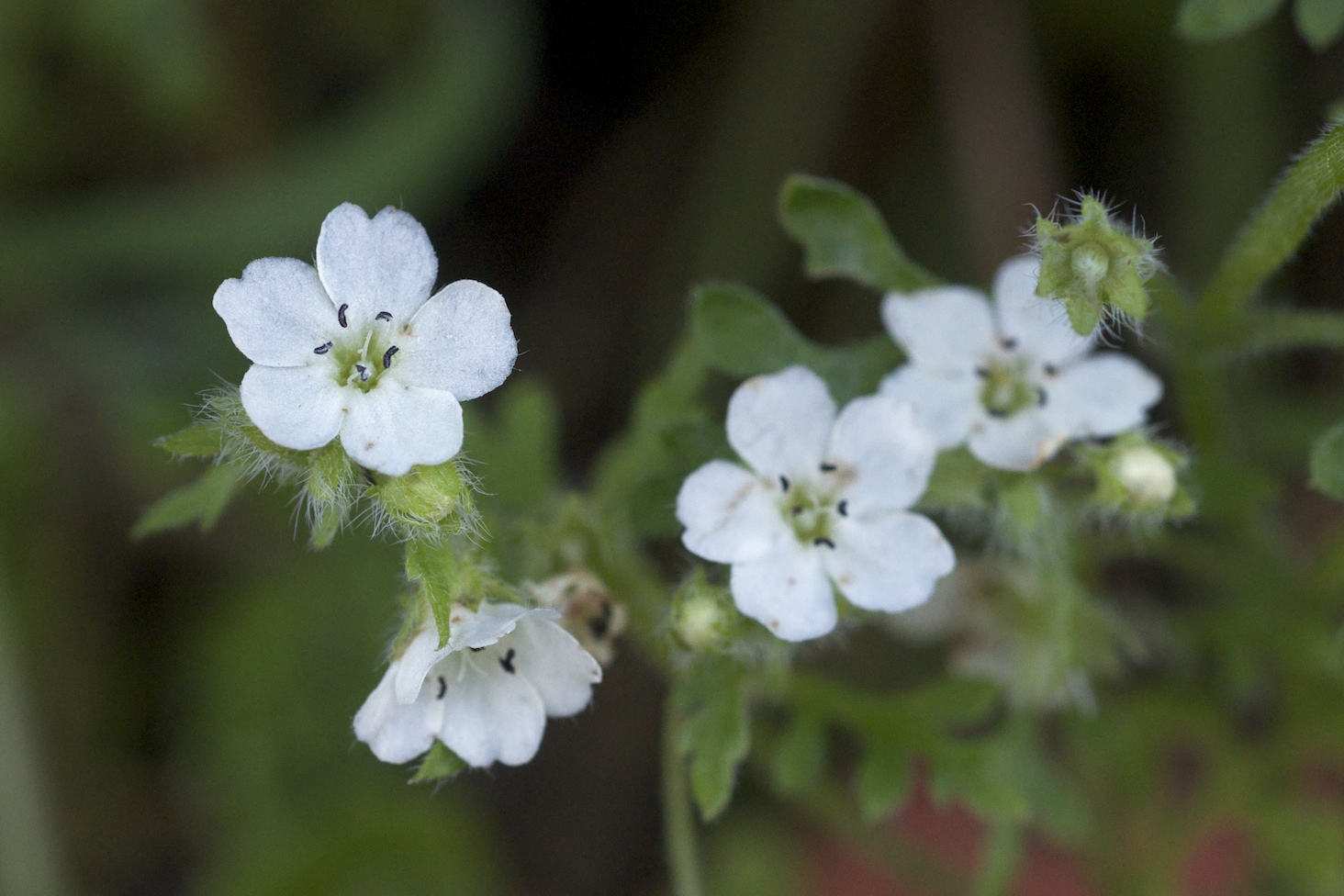

Scientific classification
- Kingdom: Plantae
- Clade: Tracheophytes
- Clade: Angiosperms
- Clade: Eudicots
- Clade: Asterids
- Order: Boraginales
- Family: Hydrophyllaceae
- Genus: Nemophila
- Species: N. heterophylla

Binomial name
- Nemophila heterophylla Fisch. & C.A.Mey.

= Nemophila heterophylla =

Species of flowering plant

Nemophila heterophylla is a species of flowering plant known by the common name small baby blue eyes. The genus Nemophila is placed in the family Hydrophyllaceae.

It is native to Oregon and California north of the Transverse Ranges. It grows in many types of habitat, from valley chaparral to mountain talus.

== Description ==
Nemophila heterophylla is an annual herb with a fleshy but delicate and usually hairy stem. The lower leaves are oppositely arranged and divided into several wide lobes. Upper leaves are smaller, narrower, and alternately arranged.

Flowers are solitary, each on a short pedicel. The flower has a calyx of sepals each a few millimeters long, pointed, and covered with long hairs, and there are reflexed appendages between the sepals. The bowl-shaped flower corolla is white or blue and a few millimeters to over a centimeter wide.

The fruit is a capsule which develops within the calyx of sepals and contains a few yellowish seeds.
