= Belle Plains, Virginia =

Human settlement in the United States

Coordinates: 38°20′33.38″N 77°19′50.71″W

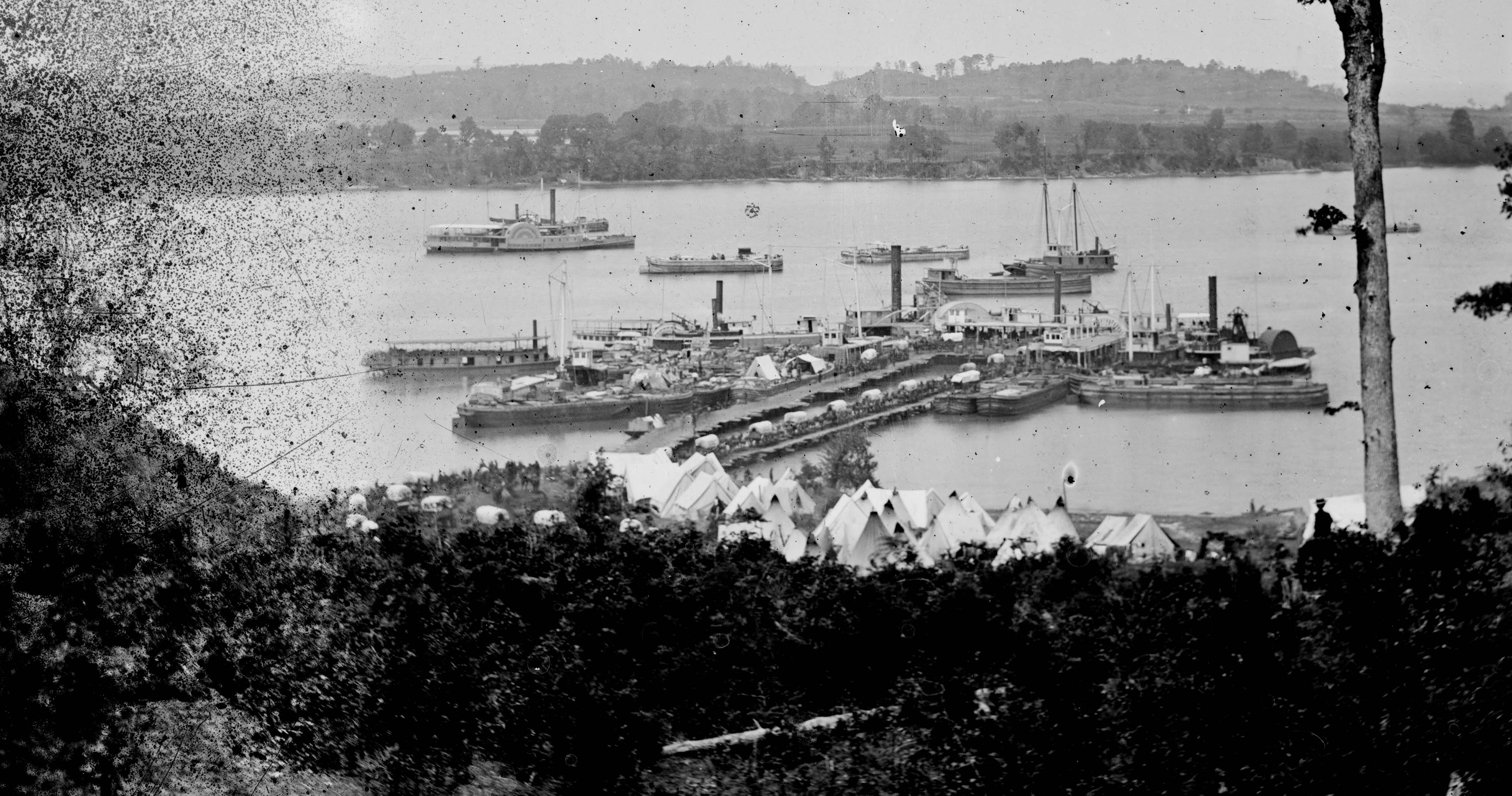
Belle Plains landing during the American Civil War

Belle Plains, Virginia (sometimes spelled as Belle Plain) was a steamboat landing and unincorporated settlement on the south bank of Potomac Creek off the Potomac River, in Stafford County, Virginia.

In the early 19th-century, Belle Plains served as landing for steamboats to Washington, D.C. The landing and its hotel were in turn was serviced by stagecoaches running to and from nearby Fredericksburg, Virginia where passengers would connect with the Richmond, Fredericksburg, and Potomac Railroad. Bell Plains and Potomac Creek fell by the wayside when the railroad bypassed them, reaching Aquia Landing on Aquia Creek as its terminus wharf in 1842.

Belle Plains again rose to prominence during the American Civil War, where it was used as an alternate supply point to Aquia Landing by the Union Army of the Potomac. It became a lead supply point during the Overland Campaign of 1864.

== See also ==
- Harrison's Landing, also used as a river supply base by the Army of the Potomac
- White House, Virginia, also used as a river supply base by the Army of the Potomac
- City Point, Virginia, also used as a river supply base by the Army of the Potomac
