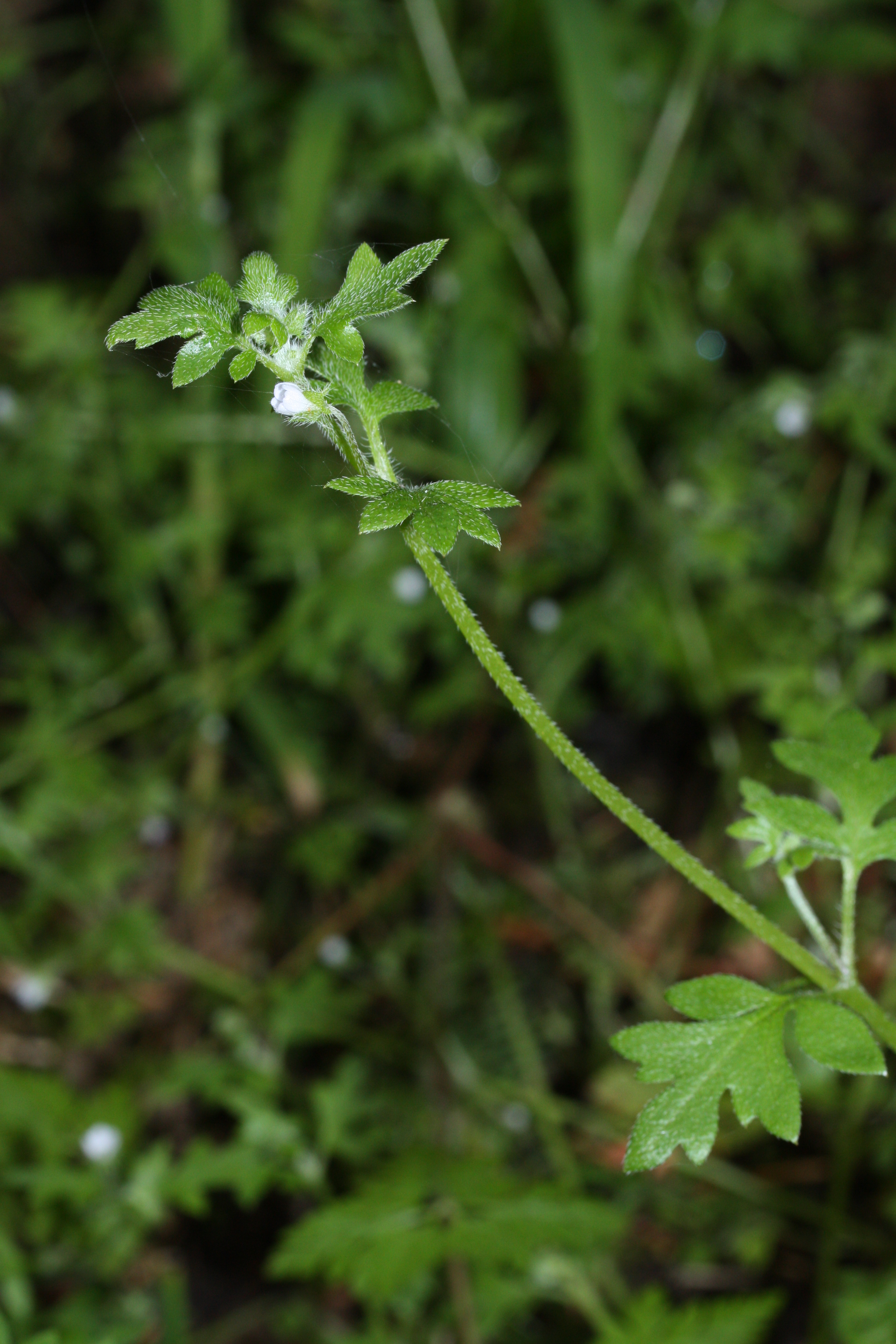
- var. parviflora

Scientific classification
- Kingdom: Plantae
- Clade: Tracheophytes
- Clade: Angiosperms
- Clade: Eudicots
- Clade: Asterids
- Order: Boraginales
- Family: Hydrophyllaceae
- Genus: Nemophila
- Species: N. parviflora

Binomial name
- Nemophila parviflora Dougl. ex Benth.

= Nemophila parviflora =

Species of flowering plant

Nemophila parviflora is known as the smallflower nemophila, small-flowered nemophila or oak-leaved nemophila. The genus Nemophila is placed in the family Hydrophyllaceae.

The plant is native to the low to moderate elevation forests and chaparral and oak woodlands of western North America, from California to British Columbia and Utah.

== Description ==
Nemophila parviflora is an annual herb that grows in the spring.

The flowers are bowl-shaped, white to lavender, solitary from leaf axils. The corolla is up to 4.5 millimeters wide. The leaves are 10–35 mm long and 8–25 mm wide. They have 2 pairs of lateral lobes and the lobes are entire.

The fruit is a capsule with a single seed.

=== Varieties ===
Varieties include:

- Nemophila parviflora var. austiniae
- Nemophila parviflora var. parviflora
- Nemophila parviflora var. quercifolia
