= Henry Fitzhugh (sheriff) =

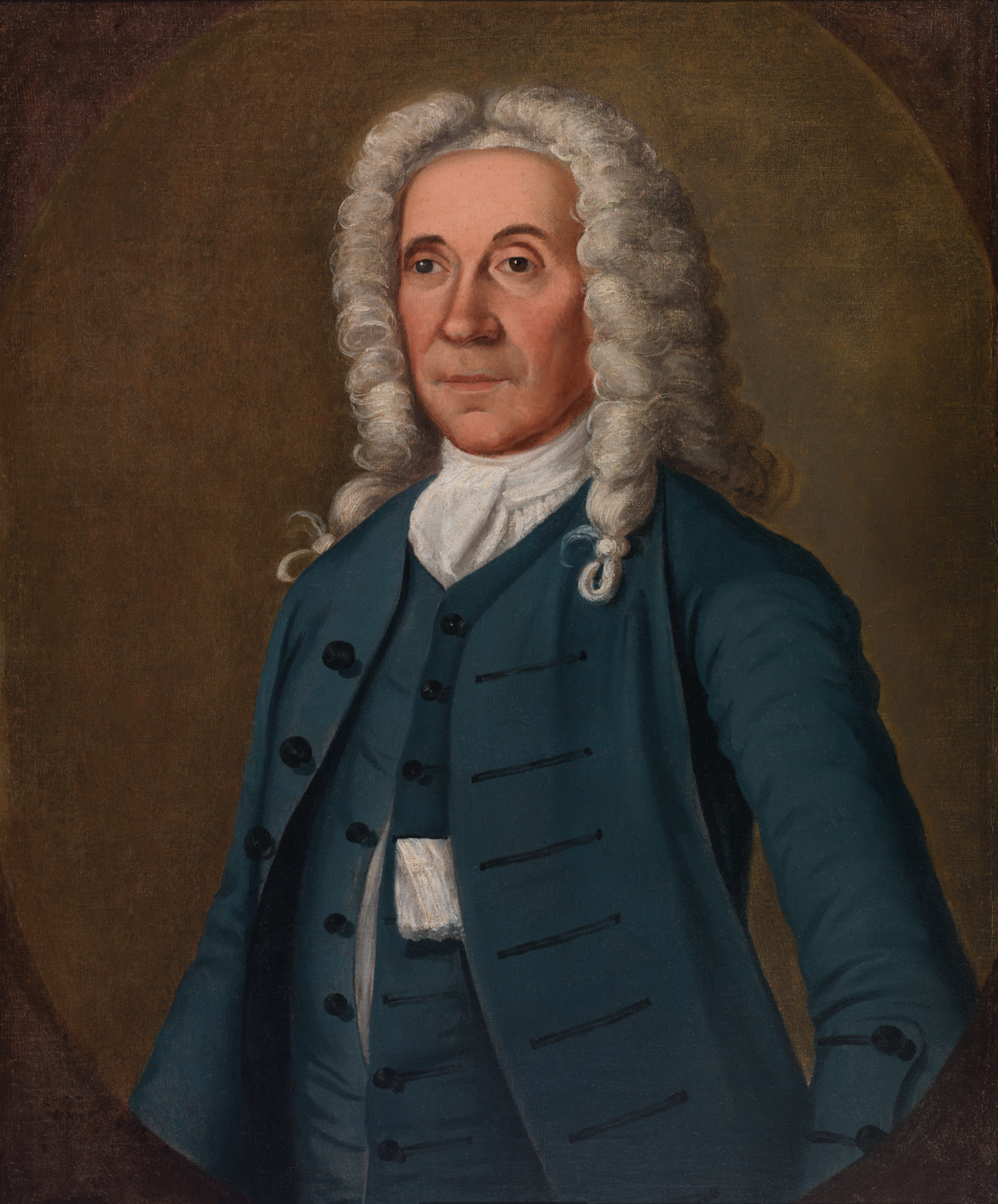
- Portrait by John Hesselius, c. 1751

Member of the House of Burgesses from Stafford County
- In office 1712–1714 Serving with John Waugh
- Preceded by: George Mason II
- Succeeded by: George Fitzhugh

Personal details
- Born: January 15, 1686 "Bedford", King George, Virginia
- Died: December 12, 1758 (aged 72)
- Spouse: Susannah Cooke
- Children: Henry Fitzhugh

Henry Fitzhugh (January 15, 1686 – December 12, 1758) was an American planter who served a term in the House of Burgesses.

== Early and family life ==
The longest-surviving of five sons of William Fitzhugh of Bedford plantation in King George County, Virginia and his wife Mary, daughter of John Tucker of Westmoreland County, was named after his English grandfather and born into the First Families of Virginia. His birth family also included brothers William, Thomas, George and John Fitzhugh, as well as a sister, Rosamund. His brothers George Fitzhugh (who married the daughter of fellow planter George Mason II and had two sons before his death in 1722) and Major John Fitzhugh (who married the daughter of Daniel McCarthy, speaker of the House of Burgesses and who died in 1733) also served terms in the House of Burgesses.

In 1718 this Henry Fitzhugh married Susannah Cooke, daughter of planter Mordecai Cooke of Gloucester County. Their son, also Henry Fitzhugh (1723–1783), would become colonel of the local militia and have several sons who fought Britain in the American Revolutionary War.

== Career ==
Like other members of his family, Henry Fitzhugh operated large plantations acquired by his father and by using enslaved labor. His were located in Stafford County.

Following his father's expectations, he was elected as one of Stafford County's representatives in the House of Burgesses in 1712, and he served alongside fellow planter John Waugh during the 1712-1714 session, before being replaced by his younger brother George Fitzhugh. Henry Fitzhugh then served as Stafford County's High Sheriff in 1715.
