= Accokeek (plantation) =

Coordinates: 38°28′3″N 77°30′28″W

Accokeek was a 17th-century plantation on Accokeek Creek in Stafford County, Virginia, United States. Accokeek was the first seat of the prominent Mason political family in Virginia.

In 1653, the tract of land that would become Accokeek was granted to John Withers, who then sold it to Colonel Valentine Peyton (1627-1665). In 1662, Peyton sold the tract, along with 500 contiguous acres (2.0 km^{2}) granted to Peyton, to Captain George Mason I. George Mason I (5 June 1629–1686), the progenitor of the prominent American landholding and political Mason family, made his permanent residence along Accokeek Creek on a hill between present-day State Routes 608 (Brooke Road) and 621 (Marlborough Point Road) in Stafford County, Virginia. He christened his plantation "Accokeek," which was later renamed "Rose Hill." Mason's Accokeek plantation began with about 650 acres (2.6 km^{2}) and eventually increased in size to 1,150 acres (4.7 km^{2}).

George Mason I's son George Mason II was born in 1660 at Accokeek. George Mason II sold Accokeek after his father's death and moved to Chopawamsic plantation on Chopawamsic Creek.
