= Potomac Creek =

Coordinates: 38°20′50.45″N 77°17′10.93″W

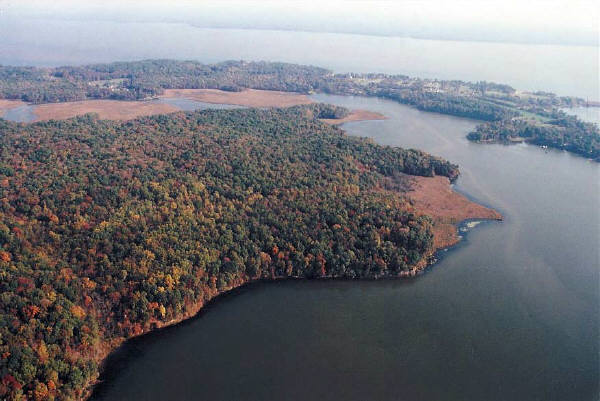
- Accokeek Creek entering Potomac Creek; Potomac River in background

Location
- Country: United States
- State: Virginia
- Counties: King George and Stafford

Physical characteristics
- Mouth
  - location: Potomac River
  - elevation: 0 feet (0 m)
- Length: 16.7 mi (26.9 km)

Potomac Creek is a 16.7-mile-long (26.9 km) tidal tributary of the Potomac River in King George and Stafford counties, Virginia. Potomac Creek's source lies between the communities of Glendie and Paynes Corner in Stafford County. It empties into the Potomac River at Marlboro Point. Potomac Creek forms as a dam to form Abel Lake.

== Tributaries ==
Tributary streams are listed from source to mouth.

- Long Branch
- Beaverdam Run
- Swamp Branch
- Accokeek Creek

== See also ==
- Potomac Creek Bridge
- Crow's Nest Natural Area Preserve
- List of rivers of Virginia
