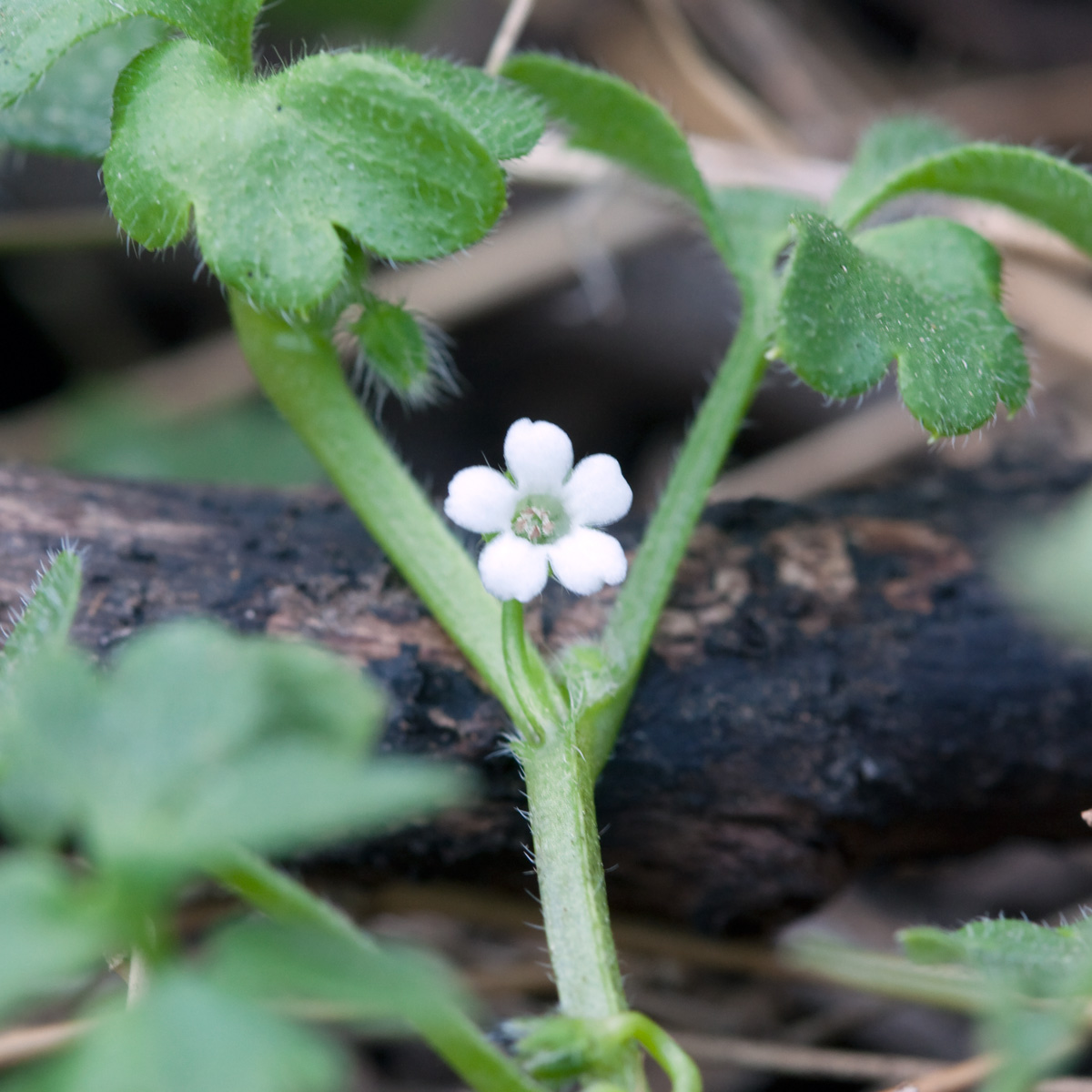

Scientific classification
- Kingdom: Plantae
- Clade: Tracheophytes
- Clade: Angiosperms
- Clade: Eudicots
- Clade: Asterids
- Order: Boraginales
- Family: Hydrophyllaceae
- Genus: Nemophila
- Species: N. aphylla

Binomial name
- Nemophila aphylla (L.) Brummitt

= Nemophila aphylla =

Smallflower baby blueeyes

Species of flowering plant

Nemophila aphylla, the smallflower baby blue eyes, is an annual flowering plant that is endemic to the southeastern United States and typically found in rich, moist woodlands. It has very small white or pale blue flowers, typically about 0.12 inches wide, that bloom from March to May. The genus Nemophila is placed in the family Hydrophyllaceae.
