= George Brent (politician) =

English-born planter, lawyer, and politician (1640–1694)

Member of the Virginia House of Delegates from the Stafford County district
- In office May 1, 1688 – 1689 Serving with George Mason II
- Preceded by: Samuel Hayward
- Succeeded by: Martin Scarlett

Acting Attorney General for the Virginia colony
- In office after November 16, 1686 – before May 1, 1688
- Preceded by: Edward Hill
- Succeeded by: Edmund Jenings

Personal details
- Born: c. 1640 Warwickshire, England
- Spouse(s): Elizabeth Greene; Mary Chandler
- Children: 4
- Occupation: Planter, lawyer, militia leader

George Brent (died c. 1699) was an English-born planter, lawyer, and politician who spent most of his life in the colony of Virginia. He represented Stafford County, Virginia in the Virginia General Assembly and secured a refuge for Catholics in the Virginia Colony that became Brentsville, Virginia.

== Early life ==
Brent was the firstborn son of George Brent and Marianna, the daughter of Sir John Peyton of Doddington on the Isle of Ely. Facing persecution during the English Civil Wars because of their Catholic religion (a sister was a nun in France), his uncle Giles Brent (third son of Richard Brent) and maiden aunts Mary and Margaret Brent had emigrated to Maryland in 1637. However, in the next decade they encountered problems a from rival Protestant trader Richard Ingle as well as the colonial Maryland political establishment, and emigrated across the Potomac River to Stafford County, Virginia.

== Career ==
Coat of Arms of George Brent

Brent emigrated by 1670 to join his older relatives, and built a plantation at Woodstock, near the plantations they had established. His first wife, Elizabeth Greene of Bermuda, whom he married in 1677, died giving birth to a daughter in 1686. He then married Mary, the widow of Col. William Chandler. She already had several children (one son became a Benedictine priest), and had more with Brent, but only Henry, Mary and Martha lived. Their mother Mary Brent died in 1693 or 1694 giving birth to their last daughter.

A document from December 1670 indicates Brent was already practicing law in the colony (representing a haberdasher in a debt action). By 1686, George Brent was the interim King's attorney (prosecutor) for the Virginia colony. As King's attorney, Brent also once sued his fellow lawyer and sometimes business partner William Fitzhugh, as discussed below, for unpaid tobacco taxes. Brent served for about two years until promoted to the House of Burgesses.

George Brent was sometimes referred to as "Captain" or "Major" Brent (as was his cousin Giles Brent) or "George Brent of Woodstock" (as would be some descendants) because he was partly responsible for local defense of Virginia's Northern Neck and later areas westward toward the Blue Ridge Mountains. In 1675 George Brent and George Mason II led the militia response to the death of a colonist by Indian raiders; their raid against what turned out to be peaceable Doeg Indians (who were murdered) was a prelude to Bacon's Rebellion the following year, and expulsion of most native peoples from the coastal region. Around 1681, Brent and William Fitzhugh provisioned forts near the Potomac River against Indian raids. In 1684, Brent led an expedition to defend Rappahannock River settlements against Seneca raiders. In 1690 Brent (until his death) and William Fitzhugh succeeded Col. Ludwell as rangers general, as well as agents for the proprietors of the Northern Neck (Thomas Culpeper and later Lord Fairfax).

In April 1688 Brent became one of the delegates representing Stafford County in the House of Burgesses(the predecessor of the Virginia General Assembly). The only Catholic in that body, he was allowed to take the Oath of a Burgess without the Oath of Supremacy. However, the following year, rumors spread by a Protestant parson stoked fears that Brent was helping Indians attack colonists, and he was forced to seek refuge with William Fitzhugh against the unruly mob, although the accusation was soon quashed.

After the revocation of the Edict of Nantes, Huguenot refugees arrived in England by 1685. London notary public Nicholas Hayward thought they would be ideal immigrants for the Virginia colony. On February 10, 1686/7, King James II issued a charter to George Brent, and merchants Richard Foote and Robert Bristow of London (which Hayward notarized) awarding the four-man company 30,000 acres (which the King purchased from Lord Thomas Culpeper). The document showed the royal intent that the inhabitants would be free to exercise "their Religion without being prosecuted or molested upon any penall law or othe–r account for the same ... provided they behaved themselves in all Civill matters so as to become peaceable and Loyall subjects."

By 1688, George Brent had a road cut to Brent Town (later Brentsville, Virginia). A block house for protection during Indian raids was erected overlooking a major military and trading route. When Hayward's plan to send Huguenots failed by the following year (and Protestant William III and Mary II succeeded the deposed Catholic James II leading to anti-Catholic persecutions), Brent decided the tract could be a refuge for Catholics.

== Death and legacy ==
Brent died in 1699. His will written in 1694 was admitted to probate on September 1, 1700. Most of his vast landholdings (about 15,000 acres) including Woodstock passed to his firstborn son (also George), then grandson (also George). The circa 2000 acres of Brent Town later passed to his grandson (also George) and in 1804 to Daniel Carroll Brent, a distant cousin. His will also detailed 25 enslaved persons.

In 1742, residents of Brent Town petitioned the House of Burgesses, indicating that the village existed on a section by then owned by descendants of Richard Foote near the tract's western edge.

Brent was buried in the family cemetery, now near St. William of York parish and owned by the Catholic Archdiocese of Arlington. Since 1930, a large crucifix has stood nearby, next to historic Route 1, honoring the area's first Catholic settlers and their role in establishing religious liberty in Virginia.
