= Martin Scarlett =

Member of the House of Burgesses from Stafford County
- In office 1695–1695 Serving with George Mason
- Preceded by: Thomas Ousley
- Succeeded by: John Withers
- In office 1691–1633 Serving with George Mason, John Withers, Thomas Ousley
- Preceded by: George Mason
- Succeeded by: George Mason
- In office 1685–1687 Serving with Samuel Hayward
- Preceded by: George Mason
- Succeeded by: George Mason
- In office 1682–1683 Serving with William Fitzhugh
- Preceded by: George Mason
- Succeeded by: George Mason

Personal details
- Born: 1656 England
- Died: 1695 Stafford County
- Resting place: Rippon Lodge, Prince William County, Virginia, US
- Occupation: Planter, politician

Martin Scarlett or Scarlet (circa 1640–1695), was a Virginia planter and military officer who served in the House of Burgesses representing Stafford County, as well as in local offices, including Justice of the Peace in 1680.

== Biography ==
Scarlett had emigrated from England and stated in a 1691 court that he had lived in Stafford County for more than 30 years, which record survived because the case had been appealed to the General Court in Williamsburg.

His plantation, which he called "Deep Hole" because of an artesian spring, was near the confluence of the Potomac River and Occoquan Creek, near both Belmont Bay and Marumsco Creek, not far from where Captain John Smith landed on one of his Potomac expeditions and which was frequented by Native peoples. That area split from Stafford County to become Prince William County in 1731, well after his death. Around 1655, Scarlett purchased 700 acres from the widow of Thomas Burbage of Nansemond County (who had remarried to Capt. Edward Streator). Then, in 1666, Scarlett and Richard Normansell patented 2,550 acres on what later would be called Mason Neck north of that confluence, in what split from Prince William County and became Fairfax County, Virginia about a decade after the split from Stafford County. In 1674, the Stafford County court divided the parcel (using Pohick Creek as the dividing line between Normanstone's and Scarlett's shares); Scarlett sold all but 320 acres of his share, along Pohick Creek, to George Mason on 10 March 1690.

Around 1675/6, Scarlet had married a widow, Ann Green (widow of William Greene Jr., who was affiliated with Lawrence who rebelled in Bacon's Rebellion), and in his lifetime had given half his Deep Hole farm to his stepson Joseph Green. Ann Green Scarlett also had two daughters: Anne who married Edward Barton, and Lettice married Edward Smith (and had 3 children before being widowed) then remarried around 1695 to Burr Harrison (1668–1715). Anne Green Scarlett bequeathed the 740 acre Deep Hole property to her son Joshua Green in October 1696, and the rest of the former Normansell property to Edward Barton. When Joshua Green died childless, the property passed to Lettice Green Smith Harrison, who died probably in 1699, since Harrison petitioned the Stafford Court to become the guardian of his late wife's three children. In 1765 Lettice's great-grandson John Hancock sold the property to Col. John Tayloe.

== Recent history ==
Early in the 20th century, while the house had long vanished, the family' graveyard remained near the end of Dawson's Beach Road, about two miles from the former ferry at "Woodbridge" in what eventually became the Occoquan Bay National Wildlife Refuge.The Works Progress Administration noted gravestones for Scarlett and a relation with a mostly illegible name which referenced a 1698 death date. While the original historian thought the next most legible name was "John", modern archeologists believe that it was for his widow ("relict") since it mentioned a marriage as well as the 1698 death date, and no records indicate that Martin and Ann had any children together. In 1902 tombstones from the graveyard desecrated during the Civil War were found at the mouth of Occoquan Creek. By this time the farm had been acquired by John Lindsay Dawson (1877 to 1967) of Fairfax County, who raised cattle and wheat and operated a fishery, and used the two tombstones to delineate the corners of his farm on Occoquan and Marumsco Creeks. In 1950 the Department of the Army purchased 648.61 acres known as Deep Hole farm, and built the Woodbridge Research Facility (a/k/a/ Harry Diamond Lab), which was transferred to the Interior Department's Fish and Wildlife Service in the early 2002. Thus, while Scarlett's actual resting place on what was once his plantation has been lost, his tombstone was moved south in 2005 to the cemetery at Rippon Lodge, on the National Register of Historic Places and currently operated under the authority of Prince William County's Historical Preservation Division.
