= Accokeek people =

Historical Native American tribe from Maryland

Accokeek
Total population
- Extinct as a tribe

Regions with significant populations
- Maryland

Languages
- Eastern Algonquian

Religion
- Native American religion

Related ethnic groups
- Piscataway and other Algonquian-speaking peoples of the Potomac River

The Accokeek (Note: Or Accocick, Accotick, Accokicke.) were a group of Native Americans living in Southern Maryland at the time of English colonization. They lived along the Potomac River in present-day Prince George's County, Maryland. They were an Algonquian-language tribe and were related to the Piscataway, another Algonquian-language tribe.

Accokeek, Maryland, a small unincorporated town in Maryland, was named after the Accokeek tribe.

== Name ==
Accokeek is one of many Algonquian place names along the Potomac that were written down by early colonists, John Smith among them. It is generally translated as "at the edge of the hill". Early records give the name in several forms, including Accocick, Accotick and Accokicke.

== History ==
=== The Piscataway and their bands ===
At the time of contact, the Piscataway were the largest and most powerful nation between the Chesapeake Bay and the Potomac, holding territory across present-day Charles, Prince George's and St. Mary's counties. Smaller bands, among them the Chaptico, Moyaone, Nanjemoy and Potapoco, were bound together under a leader called a werowance, and later under a paramount chief known as a tayac. Writers who describe the Accokeek as a separate band place them within this network and identify them with the Moyaone of Prince George's County.

=== Moyaone and the Accokeek Creek Site ===
The Accokeek Creek Site, a large palisaded town on the Potomac between Piscataway and Accokeek creeks, is closely tied to the group. Alice L. L. Ferguson, who owned the land and excavated it between 1935 and 1939, identified the town as Moyaone, the village recorded as "Moyaons" on the 1612 map attributed to John Smith. Later archaeologists have questioned that identification, and the precise location of Moyaone remains uncertain.

In 1608 Moyaone was a sizeable stockaded settlement whose people were often at odds with the Powhatan towns on the Virginia shore. After the trader Henry Spelman and much of his party were killed on the Potomac in 1623, the Virginia governor Francis Wyatt ordered villages on both banks burned in retaliation. Moyaone appears to have been among them, and its inhabitants are thought to have withdrawn to a Piscataway fort on Piscataway Creek. Ferguson's work uncovered successive palisade lines, hearths, storage and refuse pits, and several ossuaries holding well over a thousand people. Her findings were published in 1963 in what is still the main report on the site.

=== Decline ===
English settlement spread quickly after the founding of the Maryland colony in 1634, and by the 1690s most Piscataway land in Prince George's and Charles counties had passed into colonial hands. Some Piscataway left the region left and joined the Haudenosaunee Confederacy. The Accokeek tribe is extinct as a tribe. Its members were absorbed into the surviving Piscataway population.

== Legacy ==
The Accokeek name remains on the land in the town of Accokeek and in nearby waterways. The Accokeek Creek Site, preserved within Piscataway Park across the river from Mount Vernon, is a National Historic Landmark and is regarded as one of the more important Native sites in the region.

== Sources ==
- The prehistoric people of Accokeek Creek, p. 25
