= Accokeek Creek =

Stream in Virginia, USA

Accokeek Creek Tributary to Potomac Creek
- Location of Accokeek Creek mouth Accokeek Creek (the United States)

Location
- Country: United States
- State: Virginia
- County: Stafford

Physical characteristics
- Source: Aquia Creek divide
  - location: about 0.25 miles northeast of Moores Corners, Virginia
  - coordinates: 38°27′31″N 077°28′26″W
  - elevation: 285 ft (87 m)
- Mouth: Potomac Creek
  - location: Crows Nest Point, Virginia
  - coordinates: 38°21′00″N 077°18′18″W
  - elevation: 0 ft (0 m)
- Length: 14.60 mi (23.50 km)
- Basin size: 22.81 square miles (59.1 km^{2})
- Discharge
  - location: Potomac Creek
  - average: 23.72 cu ft/s (0.672 m^{3}/s) at mouth with Potomac Creek

Basin features
- Progression: southeast
- River system: Potomac River
- Tributaries
  - left: unnamed tributaries
  - right: unnamed tributaries
- Bridges: Shelton Shop Road, Monument Drive (x2), Ramoth Church Road, I-95, US 1, VA 608, Raven Road

Accokeek Creek is a tidal tributary of Potomac Creek, itself a tributary of the Potomac River, in Stafford County, Virginia, United States. From it headwaters to its mouth, Accokeek Creek is 15.4 miles (24.8 km) in total length.

== Nomenclature ==
The United States Board on Geographic Names officially decided upon the creek's name in 1940. Before the official naming decision, Accokeek Creek was also alternatively known as Accakeek Creek.

== Course ==
Accokeek Creek rises on the Aquia Creek divide about 0.25 miles northeast of Moores Corner, Virginia. Accokeek Creek then flows southeast to meet Potomac Creek at Crows Nest Point just upstream of the Potomac River.

== Watershed ==
Accokeek Creek drains 22.81 square miles (59.1 km^{2}) of area, receives about 43.0 in/year of precipitation, has a topographic wetness index of 390.53 and is about 60.1% forested.

== Maps ==
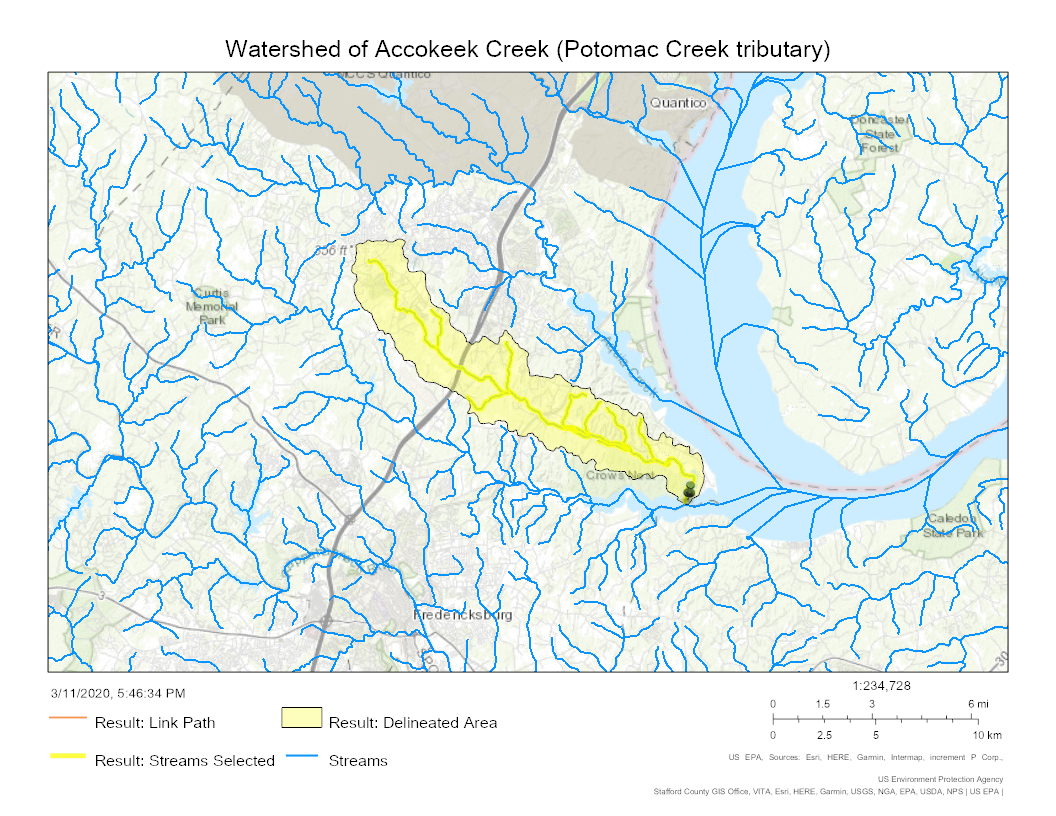
Watershed of Accokeek Creek (Potomac Creek tributary)

== See also ==
- Accokeek (plantation), homestead of George Mason I
- List of rivers of Virginia
