= Sydney Mudd =

Sydney Mudd is the name of:

- Sydney Emanuel Mudd I (1858–1911), Congressman from Maryland
- Sydney Emanuel Mudd II (1885–1924), Congressman from Maryland
