= Maryland Route 236 =

State highway in Maryland, United States

Maryland Route 236
- Thompson Corner Road
- Map of Southern Maryland with MD 236 highlighted in red

Route information
- Maintained by MDSHA
- Length: 6.19 mi (9.96 km)
- Existed: 1930–present

Major junctions
- South end: MD 234 in Budds Creek
- North end: MD 5 in Charlotte Hall

Location
- Country: United States
- State: Maryland
- Counties: St. Mary's

Highway system
- Maryland highway system; Interstate; US; State; Scenic Byways
← MD 235	→ MD 237

Maryland Route 236 (MD 236) is a state highway in the U.S. state of Maryland. Known as Thompson Corner Road, the state highway runs 6.19 miles (9.96 km) from MD 234 in Budds Creek north to MD 5 in Charlotte Hall. MD 236 parallels the western edge of St. Mary's County, connecting Charlotte Hall with U.S. Route 301 via MD 234. The state highway was constructed in the early 1930s.

== Route description ==
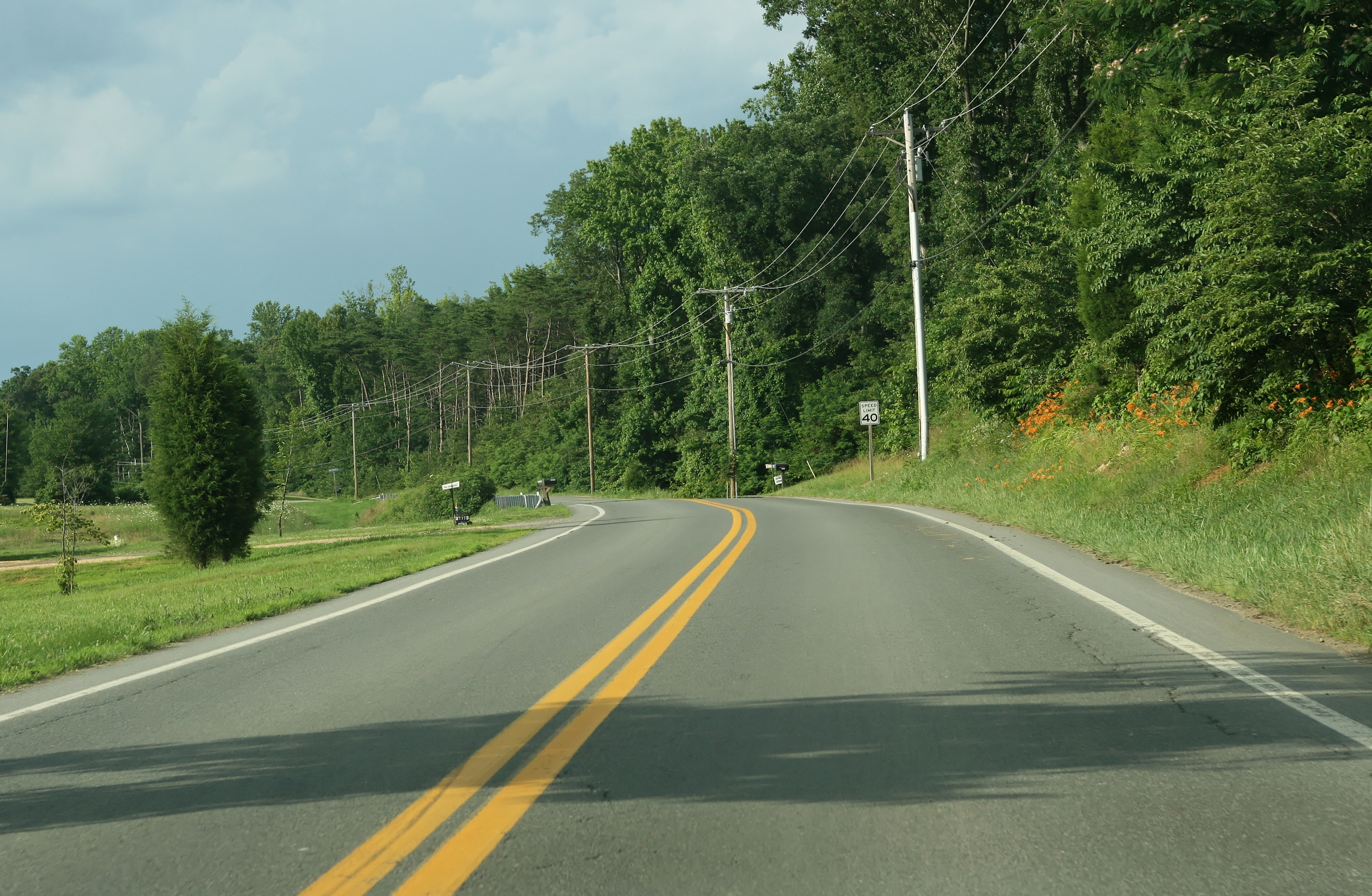
MD 236 northbound near Budds Creek

MD 236 begins at an intersection with MD 234 (Budds Creek Road) in the hamlet of Budds Creek, which is the site of a trio of racing facilities: Maryland International Raceway, Budds Creek Motocross, and Potomac Speedway. The state highway intersects the old alignment of MD 234, Stone Corner Lane (unsigned MD 868G), and heads northeast as a two-lane undivided road through farmland. The road passes several farms and homes that belong to the Amish community that lives in St. Mary's County. MD 236 intersects Lockes Crossing Road in the hamlet of Thompson Corner. The state highway continues north to Charlotte Hall, where the highway crosses the Three Notch Trail at-grade and meets New Market Village Road. New Market Village Road to the north, which is the old alignment of MD 236 and is unsigned MD 236A, heads through the hamlet of Newmarket toward the Charlotte Hall Historic District. MD 236 curves to the east to its northern terminus at MD 5 (Three Notch Road), which intersects the highway at two separate intersections separated by a wide median containing businesses.

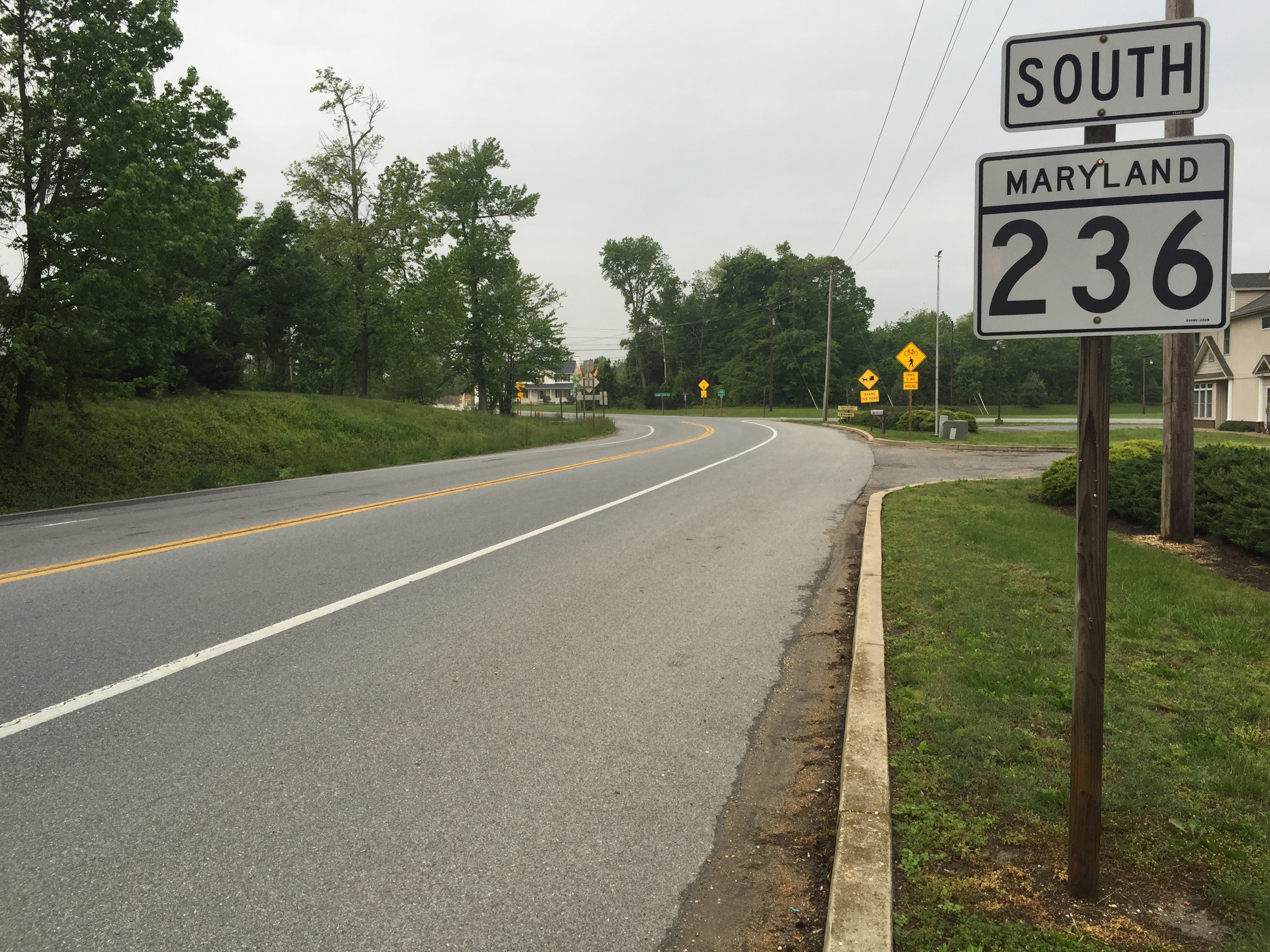
View south along MD 236 near MD 5 in Charlotte Hall

== History ==
MD 236 was constructed as a gravel road starting in 1929 from the north end. By 1930, a small segment of the highway was completed south from Charlotte Hall. MD 236 was completed in 1933 from Budds Creek to Charlotte Hall, albeit with a county-maintained gap between Wainwright Road and Ryceville Road toward the Budds Creek end. The portion of Thompsons Corner Road in the county system was transferred to the state highway system in 1956. MD 236 originally continued north along what is now MD 236A to its northern terminus at an acute intersection with MD 5 just south of the MD 5–MD 6 intersection in Charlotte Hall. When MD 5 was expanded to a divided highway through Charlotte Hall in 1962, MD 236 remained accessible only from southbound MD 5; traffic from northbound MD 5 needed to make a U-turn at MD 6 to access MD 236. The northern end of MD 236 was relocated to its present perpendicular intersections with the opposing directions of MD 5 between 1981 and 1993.

== Junction list ==
The entire route is in St. Mary's County.

Location	mi	km	Destinations	Notes
Budds Creek	0.00	0.00	MD 234 (Budds Creek Road) to US 301 – Leonardtown	Southern terminus
Charlotte Hall	6.15	9.90	MD 5 south (Three Notch Road) – Leonardtown, Lexington Park	
Charlotte Hall	6.19	9.96	MD 5 north (Three Notch Road) – Hughesville, Waldorf	Northern terminus
1.000 mi = 1.609 km; 1.000 km = 0.621 mi

== Auxiliary route ==
MD 236A is the designation for New Market Village Road, a 0.18-mile (0.29 km) two-lane undivided section of old alignment of MD 236 north through the village of Newmarket to an intersection with southbound MD 5 just south of MD 5's intersection with MD 6.
