= Frank Owens Smith =

American politician

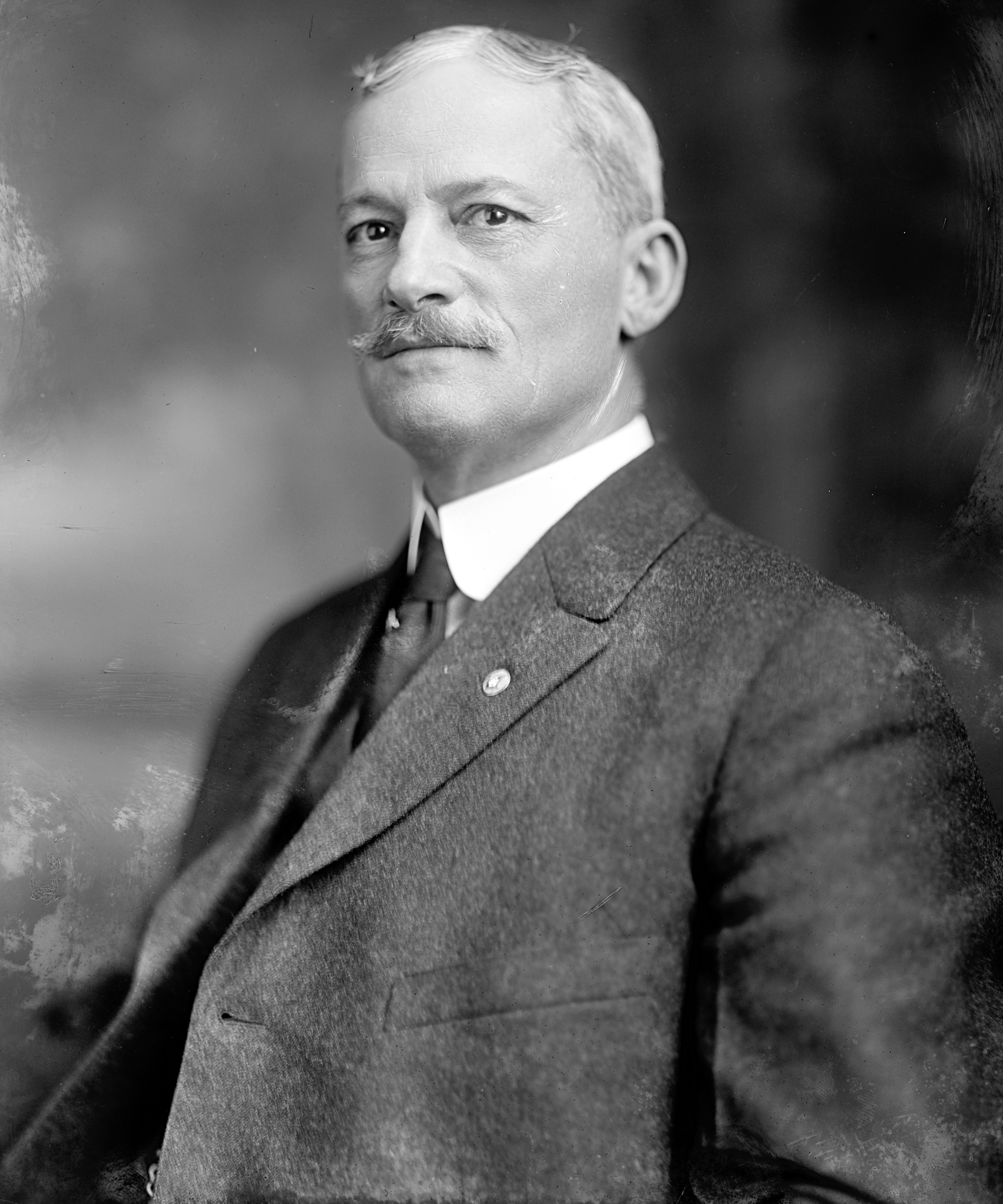

Member of the U.S. House of Representatives from Maryland's 5th district
- In office March 4, 1913 – March 3, 1915
- Preceded by: Thomas Parran Sr.
- Succeeded by: Sydney Emanuel Mudd II

Personal details
- Born: August 27, 1859 Smithville, Maryland, U.S.
- Died: January 29, 1924 (aged 64) Dunkirk, Maryland, U.S.
- Resting place: Mount Zion Cemetery; Lothian, Maryland
- Party: Democratic
- Spouse: Lillie Griffith (m. 1885)

Frank Owens Smith (August 27, 1859 – January 29, 1924) was a businessman and served in the U.S. House of Representatives.

== Early life ==
Frank Owens Smith was born on August 27, 1859, in Smithville (now Dunkirk, Maryland) to Ruth Ellen (née Owens) and John Sparrow Smith. Smith attended the private and public schools of Calvert County, Maryland, and also the North Mount Institute of West Virginia, and Bethel Military Academy of Virginia.

== Personal life ==
Smith married Lillie Griffith on March 25, 1885.

== Career ==
Smith served in the Internal Revenue Service at Baltimore, Maryland during the first Cleveland administration until 1889.

Smith organized the Calumet Canning Company in 1889 and engaged in a general merchandise business in 1890. He later engaged in manufacturing flour and feed from 1898 to 1910. He was appointed State Tobacco Inspector by Governor Edwin Warfield in 1904 and was re-appointed in 1906. He was an unsuccessful candidate for election to the Maryland State Senate in 1911. He served as chief engrossing clerk of the State Senate in 1911.

In May 1912, Smith was elected from the fifth district of Maryland as a Democrat to the Sixty-third Congress, and served from March 4, 1913, to March 3, 1915. He was an unsuccessful candidate for renomination in 1914 and 1918. He instead engaged in fruit growing in Dunkirk until his death.

== Death ==
Smith died on January 29, 1924, at his home in Dunkirk. He is interred in Mount Zion Cemetery of Lothian, Maryland.

U.S. House of Representatives
Preceded by Thomas Parran Sr.	Representative of the 5th Congressional District of Maryland; 1913–1915	Succeeded by Sydney Emanuel Mudd II
