= 1913 United States Senate special election in Maryland =

Maryland special election
- November 4, 1913
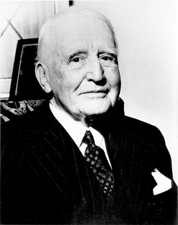

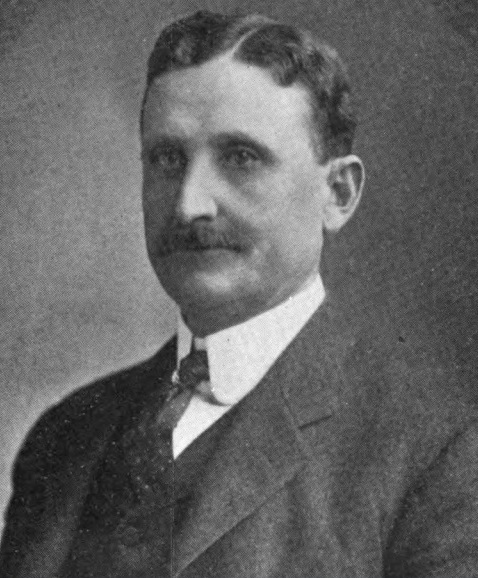
Nominee	Blair Lee	Thomas Parran Sr.
Party	Democratic	Republican
Popular vote	112,485	73,300
Percentage	56.75%	36.98%
- County results Lee: 30–40% 40–50% 50–60% 60–70% 70–80% Parran: 40–50% 50–60% 60–70%
U.S. senator before election
William P. Jackson
Republican
Elected U.S. senator
Blair Lee
Democratic

A special election to the United States Senate was held in Maryland on November 4, 1913, to fill the vacancy caused by the death of Sen. Isidor Rayner (a Democrat). The election was the second Senate election (after a June 1913 late election in Georgia) held under the Seventeenth Amendment to the United States Constitution, which required direct popular election of senators, but was the first contested by multiple parties.

Blair Lee I, a Democrat and former state senator, became the second U.S. Senator directly elected by the people of a state under the Constitution's provisions (although other states had previously elected senators indirectly through party primaries and popular elections, which were then ratified by the state legislature). The election led to a controversy when the incumbent who had been appointed to fill Rayner's seat, Republican William P. Jackson, refused to give up his seat to Lee. Jackson claimed that "since he had been appointed under the original constitutional provision, he was entitled to hold his seat until the regularly scheduled adjournment date of the Maryland state assembly." The Senate considered Jackson's challenge but eventually rejected it and seated Lee.

== Results ==
1913 Maryland U.S. Senate special election
Party	Candidate	Votes	%
Democratic	Blair Lee I	112,485	56.75%
Republican	Thomas Parran Sr.	73,300	36.98%
Progressive	George Wellington	7,033	3.55%
Socialist	Robert Fields	2,982	1.5%
Prohibition	Finley Hendrickson	2,405	1.21%
Total votes		198,205	100.00%
Democratic hold			

=== Results by county ===
County	Blair Lee Democratic	Thomas Parran Sr. Republican	Other	Total Votes Cast
County	#	#	#	#
Allegany	3,332	2,914	2,423	8,669
Anne Arundel	3,378	2,230	156	5,764
Baltimore (City)	48,658	24,028	5,553	78,239
Baltimore (County)	11,963	6,465	840	19,268
Calvert	658	1,189	46	1,893
Caroline	1,875	1,593	117	3,585
Carroll	3,536	3,180	213	6,929
Cecil	2,208	1,748	108	4,064
Charles	1,017	1,349	88	2,454
Dorchester	2,658	2,454	101	5,213
Frederick	5,163	4,633	509	10,305
Garrett	918	1,365	244	2,527
Harford	3,060	1,920	199	5,179
Howard	1,713	1,079	95	2,887
Kent	1,790	1,355	111	3,256
Montgomery	3,494	2,520	175	6,189
Prince George's	2,563	1,783	148	4,494
Queen Anne's	1,890	1,377	88	3,355
St. Mary's	957	929	81	1,967
Somerset	1,707	1,750	133	3,590
Talbot	1,824	1,427	153	3,404
Washington	425	3,764	490	4,679
Wicomico	2,718	1,902	292	4,912
Worcester	1,160	336	57	1,553
Total	112,485	73,300	6,090	198,205
