= Maryland's 5th congressional district =

U.S. House district for Maryland

Coordinates: 38.55°N 76.95°W

- Interactive map of district boundaries since January 3, 2023
- Representative: Steny Hoyer; D–Mechanicsville
- Area: 1,504.25 mi^{2} (3,896.0 km^{2})
- Distribution: 74.19% urban; 25.81% rural
- Population (2025): 826,542
- Median household income: $135,923
- Ethnicity: 43.7% White; 39.8% Black; 7.2% Hispanic; 5.3% Two or more races; 3.1% Asian; 0.9% other
- Occupation: 68% White-collar; 18.8% Blue-collar; 12.9% Gray-collar
- Cook PVI: D+17

Maryland's 5th congressional district comprises all of Charles, St. Mary's, and Calvert counties (a region known as Southern Maryland), as well as portions of Prince George's and Anne Arundel counties. The district is currently represented by Democrat Steny Hoyer, who from 2007 to 2011 and from 2019 to 2023 was House Majority Leader.

When it was defined in 1788, the 5th Congressional District centered on Salisbury, Maryland. It consisted of the current Maryland counties of Caroline, Dorchester, Wicomico, Somerset, and Worcester. In 1792 the boundaries of Maryland's congressional districts were redrawn, and the 5th District was made to include Baltimore and Baltimore County.

This district is safely Democratic, and has been in Democratic hands uninterrupted since the retirement of Lawrence Hogan (father of future Governor of Maryland Larry Hogan) in 1975. He was succeeded by Gladys Spellman, who served from 1975 until the seat was declared vacant by the House due to her falling into a coma in 1980. Hoyer won a special election that year to complete her term, and has held the seat since.

== Recent election results from statewide races ==
Year	Office	Results
2008	President	Obama 62–36%
2012	President	Obama 64–36%
2012	Senate	Cardin 56–26%
2014	Governor	Brown 50.2–49.8%
2016	President	Clinton 59–35%
2016	Senate	Van Hollen 60–36%
2018	Senate	Cardin 66–30%
2018	Governor	Hogan 54–45%
2018	Attorney General	Frosh 66–34%
2020	President	Biden 67–31%
2022	Senate	Van Hollen 67–33%
2022	Governor	Moore 66–31%
2022	Comptroller	Lierman 65–35%
2022	Attorney General	Brown 67–33%
2024	President	Harris 65–32%
2024	Senate	Alsobrooks 58–39%

== Composition ==
For the 118th and successive Congresses (based on redistricting following the 2020 census), the district contains all or portions of the following counties and communities:

Anne Arundel County (12)

Crofton, Deale, Edgewater, Fort Meade, Friendship, Galesville, Jessup (part; also 3rd, shared with Howard County), Maryland City, Mayo, Odenton, Riva, Shady Side

Calvert County (14)

All 14 communities

Charles County (13)

All 13 communities

Prince George's County (30)

Accokeek (part; also 4th), Andrews AFB, Aquasco, Baden, Bowie, Brandywine, Brock Hall, Brown Station, Camp Springs (part; also 4th), Cedarville, Clinton, Croom, Eagle Harbor, Fairwood (part; also 4th), Forestville (part; also 4th), Glenn Dale (part; also 4th), Lake Arbor (part; also 4th), Largo, Kettering, Marlboro Meadows, Marlboro Village, Marlton, Melwood, Mitchellville (part; also 4th), Rosaryville, Queen Anne, Queensland, Upper Marlboro, Westphalia, Woodmore

St. Mary's County (11)

All 11 communities

== Recent elections ==
=== 2000s ===
Maryland's 5th congressional district election, 2000
Party	Candidate	Votes	%
Democratic	Steny Hoyer (inc.)	166,231	65.09
Republican	Thomas E. Hutchins	89,109	34.89
Write-in		125	0.05
Total votes		255,375	100.00
Democratic hold			

Maryland's 5th congressional district election, 2002
Party	Candidate	Votes	%
Democratic	Steny Hoyer (inc.)	137,903	69.36
Republican	Joseph T. Crawford	60,758	30.56
Green	Bob S. Auerbach (write-in)	158	0.08
Total votes		198,819	100.00
Democratic hold			

Maryland's 5th congressional district election, 2004
Party	Candidate	Votes	%	±%
Democratic	Steny Hoyer (inc.)	204,867	68.72%	−0.64
Republican	Brad Jewitt	87,189	29.25%	−1.31
Green	Bob S. Auerbach	4,224	1.42%	+1.34
Constitution	Steve Krukar	1,849	0.62%	+0.62
Total votes		298,129	100.00	
Democratic hold				

Maryland's 5th congressional district election, 2006
Party	Candidate	Votes	%	±%
Democratic	Steny Hoyer (inc.)	168,114	82.68%	+13.96
Green	Steve Warner	33,464	16.46%	+15.04
Constitution	Peter Kuhnert	635	0.31%	−0.31
Write-in		1,110	0.55%	+0.55
Total votes		203,323	100.00	
Democratic hold				

Maryland's 5th Congressional District Election: 2008
Party	Candidate	Votes	%	±%
Democratic	Steny Hoyer (inc.)	253,854	73.65%	−9.03
Republican	Collins Bailey	82,631	23.97%	+23.97
Libertarian	Darlene H. Nicolas	7,829	2.27%	+2.27
Write-in		377	0.11	-0.44
Total votes		344,691	100.00	
Democratic hold		Swing		

=== 2010s ===
Maryland's 5th Congressional District Election: 2010
Party	Candidate	Votes	%	±%
Democratic	Steny Hoyer (inc.)	155,110	64.26%	−9.39
Republican	Charles Lollar	83,575	34.62%	+10.65
Libertarian	H Gavin Shickle	2,578	1.07%	−1.20
Write-in		120	0.05%	-0.06
Total votes		241,383	100.00	
Democratic hold				

Maryland's 5th Congressional District: 2012
Party	Candidate	Votes	%
Democratic	Steny H. Hoyer (inc.)	238,618	69.4
Republican	Tony O'Donnell	95,271	27.7
Green	Bob Auerbach	5,040	1.5
Libertarian	Arvin Vohra	4,503	1.3
Write-in		388	0.1
Total votes		343,820	100
Democratic hold			

Maryland's 5th Congressional District Election: 2014
Party	Candidate	Votes	%
Democratic	Steny H. Hoyer (inc.)	144,725	64
Republican	Chris Chaffee	80,752	35.7
N/A	Others	563	.3
Total votes		226,040	100
Democratic hold			

Maryland's 5th Congressional District Election: 2016
Party	Candidate	Votes	%
Democratic	Steny H. Hoyer (inc.)	242,989	67.4
Republican	Mark Arness	105,931	29.4
Libertarian	Jason Summers	11,078	3.1
Write-in		636	0.2
Total votes		360,634	100
Democratic hold			

Maryland's 5th congressional district, 2018
Party	Candidate	Votes	%
Democratic	Steny Hoyer (incumbent)	213,796	70.3
Republican	William Devine III	82,361	27.1
Green	Patrick Elder	4,082	1.3
Libertarian	Jacob Pulcher	3,592	1.2
Write-in		279	0.1
Republican	Johnny Rice (write-in)	99	0.0
Total votes		304,479	100
Democratic hold			

=== 2020s ===
Maryland's 5th congressional district, 2020
Party	Candidate	Votes	%
Democratic	Steny Hoyer (incumbent)	274,210	68.8
Republican	Chris Palombi	123,525	31.0
Write-in		1,104	0.3
Total votes		398,839	100
Democratic hold			

Maryland's 5th congressional district, 2022
Party	Candidate	Votes	%
Democratic	Steny Hoyer (incumbent)	182,478	65.9
Republican	Chris Palombi	94,000	33.9
Write-in		442	0.2
Total votes		276,920	100
Democratic hold			

Maryland's 5th congressional district, 2024
Party	Candidate	Votes	%
Democratic	Steny Hoyer (incumbent)	283,619	67.75
Republican	Michelle Talkington	133,985	32.01
Write-in		999	0.24
Total votes		418,603	100
Democratic hold			

== List of members representing the district ==
=== 1789–1803: one seat ===
Name	Years	Cong ress	Party	Electoral history
District created March 4, 1789
George Gale (Somerset County)	March 4, 1789 – March 3, 1791	1st	Pro-Administration	Elected in 1789. Lost re-election.
William Vans Murray (Cambridge)	March 4, 1791 – March 3, 1793	2nd	Pro-Administration	Elected in 1790. Redistricted to the 8th district.
Samuel Smith (Baltimore)	March 4, 1793 – March 3, 1803	3rd 4th 5th 6th 7th	Democratic-Republican	Elected in 1792. Re-elected in 1794. Re-elected in 1796. Re-elected in 1798. Re-elected in 1801. Retired to run for U.S. Senate.

=== 1803–1833: two seats ===
From 1803 to 1833, two seats were apportioned, elected at-large on a general ticket.

Con- gress	Years	Seat A			Seat B		
Con- gress	Years	Member	Party	Electoral history	Member	Party	Electoral history
8th	March 4, 1803 – March 3, 1805	Nicholas R. Moore (Ruxton)	Democratic-Republican	Elected in 1803. Re-elected in 1804. Re-elected in 1806. Re-elected in 1808. Lost re-election.	William McCreery (Reistertown)	Democratic-Republican	Elected in 1803. Re-elected in 1804. Re-elected in 1806. Retired.
9th	March 4, 1805 – March 3, 1807	Nicholas R. Moore (Ruxton)	Democratic-Republican	Elected in 1803. Re-elected in 1804. Re-elected in 1806. Re-elected in 1808. Lost re-election.	William McCreery (Reistertown)	Democratic-Republican	Elected in 1803. Re-elected in 1804. Re-elected in 1806. Retired.
10th	March 4, 1807 – March 3, 1809	Nicholas R. Moore (Ruxton)	Democratic-Republican	Elected in 1803. Re-elected in 1804. Re-elected in 1806. Re-elected in 1808. Lost re-election.	William McCreery (Reistertown)	Democratic-Republican	Elected in 1803. Re-elected in 1804. Re-elected in 1806. Retired.
11th	March 4, 1809 – March 3, 1811	Nicholas R. Moore (Ruxton)	Democratic-Republican	Elected in 1803. Re-elected in 1804. Re-elected in 1806. Re-elected in 1808. Lost re-election.	Alexander McKim (Baltimore)	Democratic-Republican	Elected in 1808. Re-elected in 1810. Re-elected in 1812. Retired.
12th	March 4, 1811 – March 3, 1813	Peter Little (Baltimore)	Democratic-Republican	Elected in 1810. Lost re-election.	Alexander McKim (Baltimore)	Democratic-Republican	Elected in 1808. Re-elected in 1810. Re-elected in 1812. Retired.
13th	March 4, 1813 – March 3, 1815	Nicholas R. Moore (Ruxton)	Democratic-Republican	Elected in 1812. Re-elected in 1814. Resigned.	Alexander McKim (Baltimore)	Democratic-Republican	Elected in 1808. Re-elected in 1810. Re-elected in 1812. Retired.
14th	March 4, 1815 – ????, 1815	Nicholas R. Moore (Ruxton)	Democratic-Republican	Elected in 1812. Re-elected in 1814. Resigned.	William Pinkney (Baltimore)	Democratic-Republican	Elected in 1814. Resigned to become U.S. Minister Plenipotentiary to Russia.
14th	???, 1815 – February 4, 1816	Vacant			William Pinkney (Baltimore)	Democratic-Republican	Elected in 1814. Resigned to become U.S. Minister Plenipotentiary to Russia.
14th	February 4, 1816 – April 18, 1816	Samuel Smith (Baltimore)	Democratic-Republican	Elected January 27, 1816 to finish Moore's term and seated February 4, 1816. Re-elected later in 1816. Re-elected in 1818. Re-elected in 1820. Re-elected in 1822, but resigned when elected U.S. Senator.	William Pinkney (Baltimore)	Democratic-Republican	Elected in 1814. Resigned to become U.S. Minister Plenipotentiary to Russia.
14th	April 18, 1816 – December 2, 1816	Samuel Smith (Baltimore)	Democratic-Republican	Elected January 27, 1816 to finish Moore's term and seated February 4, 1816. Re-elected later in 1816. Re-elected in 1818. Re-elected in 1820. Re-elected in 1822, but resigned when elected U.S. Senator.	Vacant		
14th	December 2, 1816 – March 3, 1817	Samuel Smith (Baltimore)	Democratic-Republican	Elected January 27, 1816 to finish Moore's term and seated February 4, 1816. Re-elected later in 1816. Re-elected in 1818. Re-elected in 1820. Re-elected in 1822, but resigned when elected U.S. Senator.	Peter Little (Freedom)	Democratic-Republican (Note: Supported the Jackson faction in the 1824 United States presidential election)	Elected September 3, 1816 to finish Pinkney's term and seated December 2, 1816. Re-elected later in 1816. Re-elected in 1818. Re-elected in 1820. Re-elected in 1822. Re-elected in 1824. Re-elected in 1826. Lost re-election.
15th	March 4, 1817 – March 3, 1819	Samuel Smith (Baltimore)	Democratic-Republican	Elected January 27, 1816 to finish Moore's term and seated February 4, 1816. Re-elected later in 1816. Re-elected in 1818. Re-elected in 1820. Re-elected in 1822, but resigned when elected U.S. Senator.	Peter Little (Freedom)	Democratic-Republican	Elected September 3, 1816 to finish Pinkney's term and seated December 2, 1816. Re-elected later in 1816. Re-elected in 1818. Re-elected in 1820. Re-elected in 1822. Re-elected in 1824. Re-elected in 1826. Lost re-election.
16th	March 4, 1819 – March 3, 1821	Samuel Smith (Baltimore)	Democratic-Republican	Elected January 27, 1816 to finish Moore's term and seated February 4, 1816. Re-elected later in 1816. Re-elected in 1818. Re-elected in 1820. Re-elected in 1822, but resigned when elected U.S. Senator.	Peter Little (Freedom)	Democratic-Republican	Elected September 3, 1816 to finish Pinkney's term and seated December 2, 1816. Re-elected later in 1816. Re-elected in 1818. Re-elected in 1820. Re-elected in 1822. Re-elected in 1824. Re-elected in 1826. Lost re-election.
17th	March 4, 1821 – December 17, 1822	Samuel Smith (Baltimore)	Democratic-Republican	Elected January 27, 1816 to finish Moore's term and seated February 4, 1816. Re-elected later in 1816. Re-elected in 1818. Re-elected in 1820. Re-elected in 1822, but resigned when elected U.S. Senator.	Peter Little (Freedom)	Democratic-Republican	Elected September 3, 1816 to finish Pinkney's term and seated December 2, 1816. Re-elected later in 1816. Re-elected in 1818. Re-elected in 1820. Re-elected in 1822. Re-elected in 1824. Re-elected in 1826. Lost re-election.
17th	December 17, 1822 – January 4, 1823	Vacant			Peter Little (Freedom)	Democratic-Republican	Elected September 3, 1816 to finish Pinkney's term and seated December 2, 1816. Re-elected later in 1816. Re-elected in 1818. Re-elected in 1820. Re-elected in 1822. Re-elected in 1824. Re-elected in 1826. Lost re-election.
17th	January 4, 1823 – March 3, 1823	Isaac McKim (Baltimore)	Democratic-Republican	Elected to finish Smith's term and seated January 8, 1823. Also elected to finish Smith's term in the next Congress. Lost re-election.	Peter Little (Freedom)	Democratic-Republican	Elected September 3, 1816 to finish Pinkney's term and seated December 2, 1816. Re-elected later in 1816. Re-elected in 1818. Re-elected in 1820. Re-elected in 1822. Re-elected in 1824. Re-elected in 1826. Lost re-election.
18th	March 4, 1823 – March 3, 1825	Isaac McKim (Baltimore)	Democratic-Republican	Elected to finish Smith's term and seated January 8, 1823. Also elected to finish Smith's term in the next Congress. Lost re-election.	Peter Little (Freedom)	Democratic-Republican	Elected September 3, 1816 to finish Pinkney's term and seated December 2, 1816. Re-elected later in 1816. Re-elected in 1818. Re-elected in 1820. Re-elected in 1822. Re-elected in 1824. Re-elected in 1826. Lost re-election.
19th	March 4, 1825 – March 3, 1827	John Barney (Baltimore)	Anti-Jacksonian	Elected in 1824. Re-elected in 1826. Lost re-election.	Peter Little (Freedom)	Anti-Jacksonian	Elected September 3, 1816 to finish Pinkney's term and seated December 2, 1816. Re-elected later in 1816. Re-elected in 1818. Re-elected in 1820. Re-elected in 1822. Re-elected in 1824. Re-elected in 1826. Lost re-election.
20th	March 4, 1827 – March 3, 1829	John Barney (Baltimore)	Anti-Jacksonian	Elected in 1824. Re-elected in 1826. Lost re-election.	Peter Little (Freedom)	Anti-Jacksonian	Elected September 3, 1816 to finish Pinkney's term and seated December 2, 1816. Re-elected later in 1816. Re-elected in 1818. Re-elected in 1820. Re-elected in 1822. Re-elected in 1824. Re-elected in 1826. Lost re-election.
21st	March 4, 1829 – March 3, 1831	Elias Brown (Freedom)	Jacksonian	Elected in 1829. Lost re-election.	Benjamin C. Howard (Baltimore)	Jacksonian	Elected in 1829. Re-elected in 1831. [data missing]
22nd	March 4, 1831 – March 3, 1833	John T. H. Worthington (Golden)	Jacksonian	Elected in 1831. [data missing]	Benjamin C. Howard (Baltimore)	Jacksonian	Elected in 1829. Re-elected in 1831. [data missing]

=== 1833–present: one seat ===
Member	Party	Years	Cong ress	Electoral history	Location
Isaac McKim (Baltimore)	Jacksonian	March 4, 1833 – March 3, 1835	23rd	Elected in 1833. Redistricted to the 4th district.	
George C. Washington (Rockville)	Anti-Jacksonian	March 4, 1835 – March 3, 1837	24th	Elected in 1835. [data missing]	
William C. Johnson (Jefferson)	Whig	March 4, 1837 – March 3, 1843	25th 26th 27th	Elected in 1837. Re-elected in 1839. Re-elected in 1841. [data missing]	
Jacob A. Preston (Perryman)	Whig	March 4, 1843 – March 3, 1845	28th	Elected late in 1844. [data missing]	
Albert Constable (Perryman)	Democratic	March 4, 1845 – March 3, 1847	29th	Elected in 1845. [data missing]	
Alexander Evans (Elkton)	Whig	March 4, 1847 – March 3, 1853	30th 31st 32nd	Elected in 1847. Re-elected in 1849. Re-elected in 1851. [data missing]	
Henry May (Baltimore)	Democratic	March 4, 1853 – March 3, 1855	33rd	Elected in 1853. [data missing]	
Henry W. Hoffman (Cumberland)	Know Nothing	March 4, 1855 – March 3, 1857	34th	Elected in 1855. Lost re-election.	
Jacob M. Kunkel (Frederick)	Democratic	March 4, 1857 – March 3, 1861	35th 36th	Elected in 1857. Re-elected in 1859. [data missing]	
Francis Thomas (Frankville)	Union	March 4, 1861 – March 3, 1863	37th	Elected in 1861. Redistricted to the 4th district.	
Benjamin G. Harris (Leonardtown)	Democratic	March 4, 1863 – March 3, 1867	38th 39th	Elected in 1863. Re-elected in 1864. [data missing]	
Frederick Stone (Port Tobacco)	Democratic	March 4, 1867 – March 3, 1871	40th 41st	Elected in 1866. Re-elected in 1868. [data missing]	
William M. Merrick (Ilchester)	Democratic	March 4, 1871 – March 3, 1873	42nd	Elected in 1870. [data missing]	
William J. Albert (Baltimore)	Republican	March 4, 1873 – March 3, 1875	43rd	Elected in 1872. [data missing]	
Eli J. Henkle (Brooklyn)	Democratic	March 4, 1875 – March 3, 1881	44th 45th 46th	Elected in 1874. Re-elected in 1876. Re-elected in 1878. [data missing]	
Andrew G. Chapman (La Plata)	Democratic	March 4, 1881 – March 3, 1883	47th	Elected in 1880. Lost re-election.	
Hart Benton Holton (Powhatan)	Republican	March 4, 1883 – March 3, 1885	48th	Elected in 1882. [data missing]	
Barnes Compton (Laurel)	Democratic	March 4, 1885 – March 20, 1890	49th 50th 51st	Elected in 1884. Re-elected in 1886. Lost election contest.	
Sydney E. Mudd I (Bryantown)	Republican	March 20, 1890 – March 3, 1891	51st	Successfully contested election. [data missing]	
Barnes Compton (Laurel)	Democratic	March 4, 1891 – May 15, 1894	52nd 53rd	Elected in 1890. Re-elected in 1892. Resigned.	
Vacant		May 15, 1894 – November 6, 1894	53rd		
Charles E. Coffin (Muirkirk)	Republican	November 6, 1894 – March 3, 1897	53rd 54th	Elected to finish Compton's term. Re-elected in 1894. [data missing]	
Sydney E. Mudd I (La Plata)	Republican	March 4, 1897 – March 3, 1911	55th 56th 57th 58th 59th 60th 61st	Elected in 1896. Re-elected in 1898. Re-elected in 1900. Re-elected in 1902. Re-elected in 1904. Re-elected in 1906. Re-elected in 1908. [data missing]	
Thomas Parran Sr. (St. Leonard)	Republican	March 4, 1911 – March 3, 1913	62nd	Elected in 1910. [data missing]	
Frank O. Smith (Dunkirk)	Democratic	March 4, 1913 – March 3, 1915	63rd	Elected in 1912. [data missing]	
Sydney E. Mudd II (La Plata)	Republican	March 4, 1915 – October 11, 1924	64th 65th 66th 67th 68th	Elected in 1914. Re-elected in 1916. Re-elected in 1918. Re-elected in 1920. Re-elected in 1922. Died.	
Vacant		October 11, 1924 – November 4, 1924	68th		
Stephen W. Gambrill (Laurel)	Democratic	November 4, 1924 – December 19, 1938	68th 69th 70th 71st 72nd 73rd 74th 75th	Elected to finish Mudd's term. Re-elected in 1924. Re-elected in 1926. Re-elected in 1928. Re-elected in 1930. Re-elected in 1932. Re-elected in 1934. Re-elected in 1936. Re-elected in 1938. Died.	
Vacant		December 19, 1938 – February 3, 1939	75th 76th		
Lansdale Sasscer (Upper Marlboro)	Democratic	February 3, 1939 – January 3, 1953	76th 77th 78th 79th 80th 81st 82nd	Elected to finish Gambrill's term. Re-elected in 1940. Re-elected in 1942. Re-elected in 1944. Re-elected in 1946. Re-elected in 1948. Re-elected in 1950. [data missing]	
Frank Small Jr. (Clinton)	Republican	January 3, 1953 – January 3, 1955	83rd	Elected in 1952. [data missing]	
Richard E. Lankford (Annapolis)	Democratic	January 3, 1955 – January 3, 1965	84th 85th 86th 87th 88th	Elected in 1954. Re-elected in 1956. Re-elected in 1958. Re-elected in 1960. Re-elected in 1962. [data missing]	
Hervey G. Machen (Hyattsville)	Democratic	January 3, 1965 – January 3, 1969	89th 90th	Elected in 1964. Re-elected in 1966. [data missing]	
Lawrence Hogan (Landover)	Republican	January 3, 1969 – January 3, 1975	91st 92nd 93rd	Elected in 1968. Re-elected in 1970. Re-elected in 1972. Retired to run for Governor.	
Gladys Spellman (Laurel)	Democratic	January 3, 1975 – February 24, 1981	94th 95th 96th 97th	Elected in 1974. Re-elected in 1976. Re-elected in 1978. Re-elected in 1980. Seat declared vacant for health reasons.	
Vacant		February 24, 1981 – May 19, 1981	97th		
Steny Hoyer (Mechanicsville)	Democratic	May 19, 1981 – present	97th 98th 99th 100th 101st 102nd 103rd 104th 105th 106th 107th 108th 109th 110th 111th 112th 113th 114th 115th 116th 117th 118th 119th	Elected to finish Spellman's term. Re-elected in 1982. Re-elected in 1984. Re-elected in 1986. Re-elected in 1988. Re-elected in 1990. Re-elected in 1992. Re-elected in 1994. Re-elected in 1996. Re-elected in 1998. Re-elected in 2000. Re-elected in 2002. Re-elected in 2004. Re-elected in 2006. Re-elected in 2008. Re-elected in 2010. Re-elected in 2012. Re-elected in 2014. Re-elected in 2016. Re-elected in 2018. Re-elected in 2020. Re-elected in 2022. Re-elected in 2024. Retiring at the end of term.	
Steny Hoyer (Mechanicsville)	Democratic	May 19, 1981 – present	97th 98th 99th 100th 101st 102nd 103rd 104th 105th 106th 107th 108th 109th 110th 111th 112th 113th 114th 115th 116th 117th 118th 119th		1983–1993 [data missing]
Steny Hoyer (Mechanicsville)	Democratic	May 19, 1981 – present	97th 98th 99th 100th 101st 102nd 103rd 104th 105th 106th 107th 108th 109th 110th 111th 112th 113th 114th 115th 116th 117th 118th 119th		1993–2003 [data missing]
Steny Hoyer (Mechanicsville)	Democratic	May 19, 1981 – present	97th 98th 99th 100th 101st 102nd 103rd 104th 105th 106th 107th 108th 109th 110th 111th 112th 113th 114th 115th 116th 117th 118th 119th		2003–2013
Steny Hoyer (Mechanicsville)	Democratic	May 19, 1981 – present	97th 98th 99th 100th 101st 102nd 103rd 104th 105th 106th 107th 108th 109th 110th 111th 112th 113th 114th 115th 116th 117th 118th 119th		2013–2023
Steny Hoyer (Mechanicsville)	Democratic	May 19, 1981 – present	97th 98th 99th 100th 101st 102nd 103rd 104th 105th 106th 107th 108th 109th 110th 111th 112th 113th 114th 115th 116th 117th 118th 119th		2023–present
Adrian Boafo (Bowie)	Democratic	Assuming office on January 3, 2027		Elected in 2026.	2023–present

== See also ==
- Maryland's congressional districts
- List of United States congressional districts

== Sources ==
- Archives of Maryland Historical List United States Representatives Maryland State Archives
- Martis, Kenneth C. (1989). The Historical Atlas of Political Parties in the United States Congress. New York: Macmillan Publishing Company.
- Martis, Kenneth C. (1982). The Historical Atlas of United States Congressional Districts. New York: Macmillan Publishing Company.
- Congressional Biographical Directory of the United States 1774–present
