= Route 903 (MTA Maryland) =

Bus route in Maryland and Washington DC

903

Overview
- System: Maryland Transit Administration
- Operator: Keller Transportation, Inc.
- Began service: 2001

Route
- Communities served: Charlotte Hall; Waldorf
- Start: Washington, DC
- Via: MD 5
- End: Charlotte Hall, Maryland

Service
- Frequency: 7 AM, 7 PM
- Journey time: 4:30 am to 8:37 am 2:40 pm to 6:42 pm
- Transfers: Amtrak; MARC Train; Metrobus; Metrorail; Virginia Railway Express

Route 903 is a commuter bus route operated by the Maryland Transit Administration in the U.S. state of Maryland and the District of Columbia between Charlotte Hall, Waldorf, Suitland, and downtown Washington, DC. The line is operated by Keller Transportation, Inc. under a service contract with MTA Maryland. Service operates on weekdays only, providing AM service from Charlotte Hall and Waldorf to Washington, and PM service from Washington to Waldorf and Charlotte Hall, operating primarily along Maryland Highway 5. The route has stops in the District of Columbia, two stops in Prince George's County (Suitland), and one stop each in Charles (Waldorf) and St. Mary's (Charlotte Hall) counties.

Route 903 first started operating in 2001 as a supplement to several other area bus routes where demand for service was high.

In 2008, MTA proposed to combine Route 913 with Route 903 in order to provide increased service to the busy M Street corridor, a change that ultimately took place on January 12, 2009. Concern was raised over whether some riders needing to transfer would have to pay a second fare when boarding another bus, but MTA stated that there would be no second fare.

This bus route was renumbered to MTA Commuter Bus Route 735.
