= Thomas Parran =

Thomas Parran may refer to:

- Thomas Parran Sr. (1860–1955), congressman from Maryland
- Thomas Parran (surgeon general) (1892–1968), son of Thomas Parran, Sr. and surgeon general of the United States
