= 1883 Maryland gubernatorial election =

- November 6, 1883
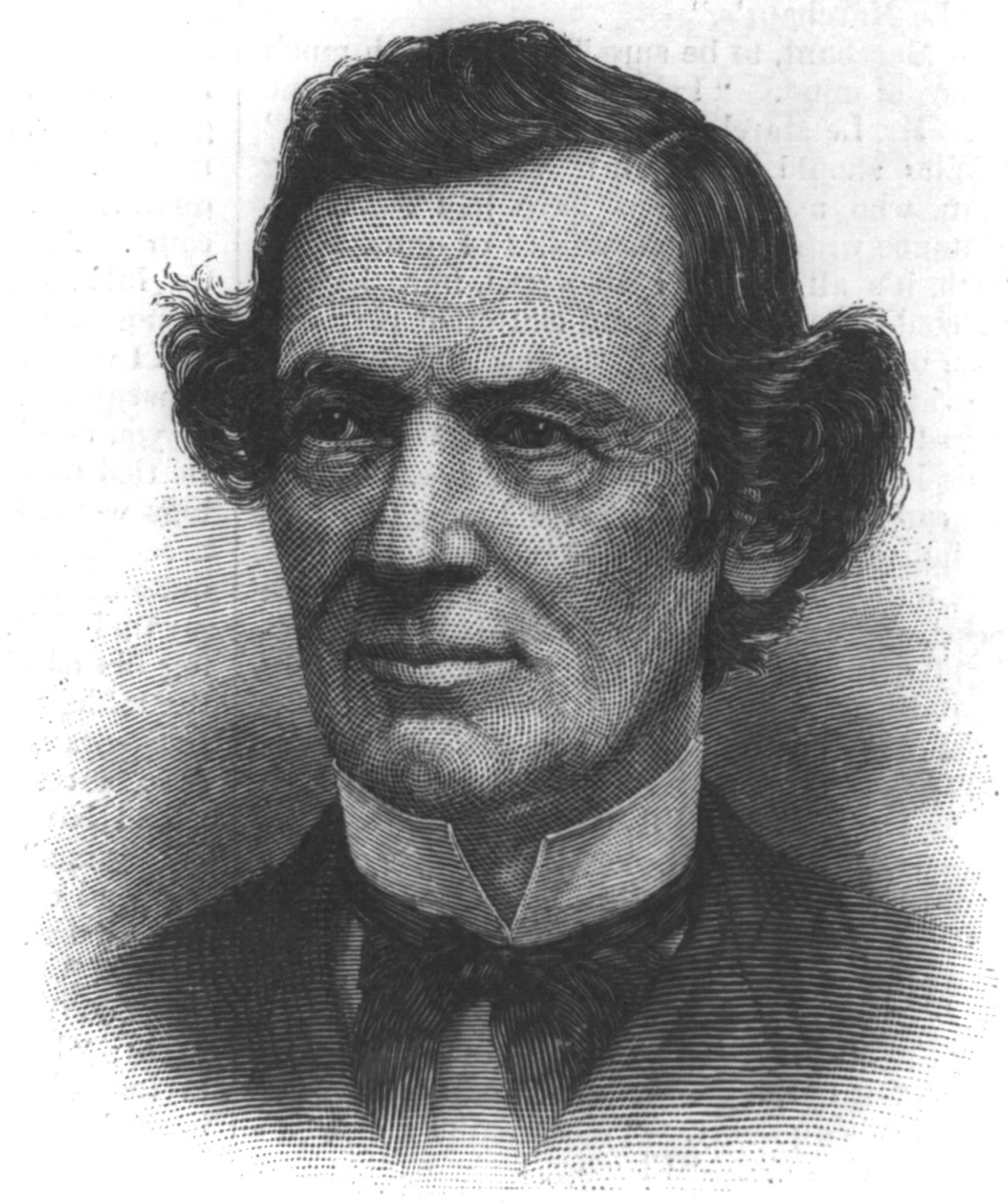

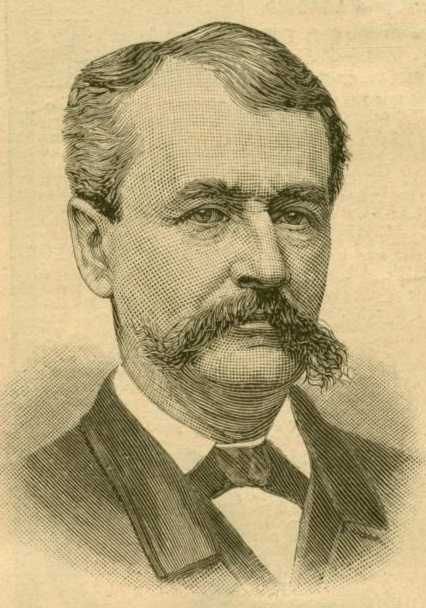
Nominee	Robert Milligan McLane	Hart B. Holton
Party	Democratic	Republican
Popular vote	92,694	80,707
Percentage	53.46%	46.54%
- County results McLane: 50–60% 60–70% Holton: 50–60%
Governor before election
William Thomas Hamilton
Democratic
Elected Governor
Robert Milligan McLane
Democratic

The 1883 Maryland gubernatorial election took place on November 6, 1883.

Incumbent Democratic Governor William Thomas Hamilton did not seek re-election.

Democratic candidate Robert Milligan McLane defeated Republican candidate Hart B. Holton.

== General election ==
=== Candidates ===
- Robert Milligan McLane, Democratic, former U.S. Congressman
- Hart B. Holton, Republican, incumbent U.S. Congressman

=== Results ===
1883 Maryland gubernatorial election (Note: Some sources give Holton's vote as 80,712.)
Party	Candidate	Votes	%	±%
Democratic	Robert Milligan McLane	92,694	53.46%	
Republican	Hart B. Holton	80,707	46.54%	
Majority		11,987	6.92%	
Turnout		173,401		
Democratic hold		Swing		
