= Sen. William P. Jackson House =

Historic house in Maryland, United States

- U.S. National Register of Historic Places
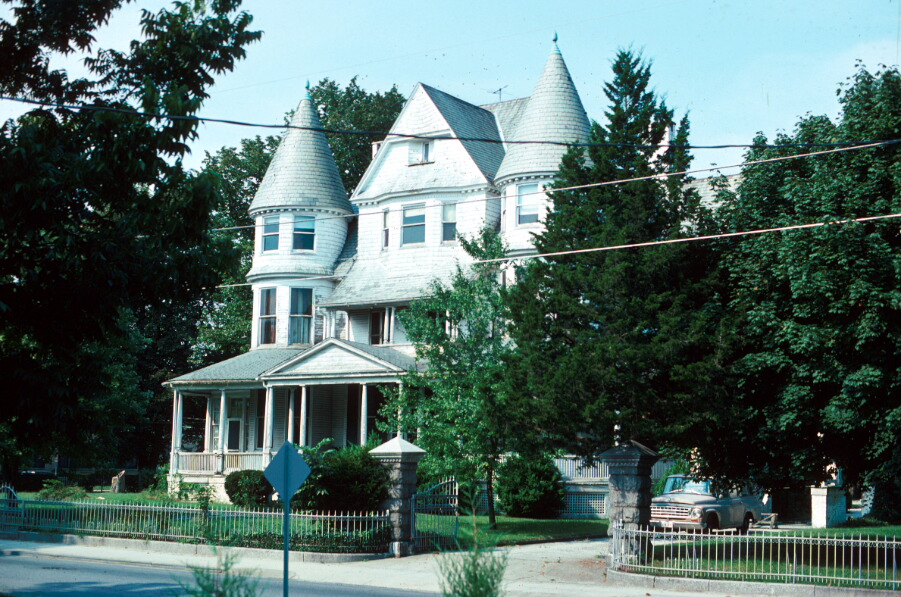
- William P Jackson House

- Location within Maryland Location within the United States
- Location: 514 Camden Ave., Salisbury, Maryland
- Coordinates: 38°21′37″N 75°36′19″W
- Area: Less than 1 acre (0.40 ha)
- Built: 1893
- Architectural style: Queen Anne
- NRHP reference No.: 76001022
- Added to NRHP: September 28, 1976

Sen. William P. Jackson House was a historic home located at Salisbury, Wicomico County, Maryland. It was a 3 1/2-story Queen Anne frame house completed in 1893. It was torn down in November 1976, after a ten-year battle to save it. It was built by United States Senator William P. Jackson.

It was listed on the National Register of Historic Places in 1976.
