= Andrew G. Chapman =

American politician

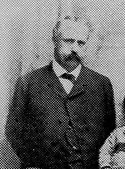

Member of the U.S. House of Representatives from Maryland's 5th district
- In office March 4, 1881 – March 3, 1883
- Preceded by: Eli Jones Henkle
- Succeeded by: Hart Benton Holton

Personal details
- Born: Andrew Grant Chapman; January 17, 1839 La Plata, Maryland, U.S.
- Died: September 25, 1892 (aged 53) La Plata, Maryland, U.S.
- Party: Democratic
- Parent: John G. Chapman (father)
- Education: St. John's College; University of Virginia

Andrew Grant Chapman (January 17, 1839 – September 25, 1892) was an American politician.

Chapman was born in La Plata, Maryland. After being tutored at home, he attended the Charlotte Hall Academy of St. Mary's County, Maryland. He graduated from St. John's College of Annapolis, Maryland, in 1858, and graduated in 1860 from the law department of the University of Virginia at Charlottesville. He moved to Baltimore, Maryland, in 1860, was admitted to the bar the same year, and commenced practice there. In 1864, Chapman moved to Port Tobacco, Maryland, and continued the practice of law and engaged in agricultural pursuits

Chapman was a member of the Maryland House of Delegates in 1867, 1868, 1870, 1872, 1879, and 1885. He was appointed aide and inspector with rank of brigadier general in 1874 on the staff of Governor James Black Groome, and was reappointed by Governor John Lee Carroll. He was elected from the fifth district of Maryland as a Democrat to the Forty-seventh Congress, and served from March 4, 1881, to March 3, 1883. He was an unsuccessful candidate for reelection in 1882 to the Forty-eighth Congress, and resumed the practice of law. He was appointed deputy collector of internal revenue in 1885 and collector in 1888, and also served as delegate to the Democratic National Convention in 1888. He died at his home, Normandy, near La Plata, and is interred at Mount Rest Cemetery of La Plata.

Chapman's father, John Grant Chapman, was also a Congressman from Maryland.

U.S. House of Representatives
Preceded by Eli Jones Henkle	Representative of the 5th Congressional District of Maryland; 1881–1883	Succeeded by Hart Benton Holton
