= William Albert =

American politician (1816-1879)

William Julian Albert
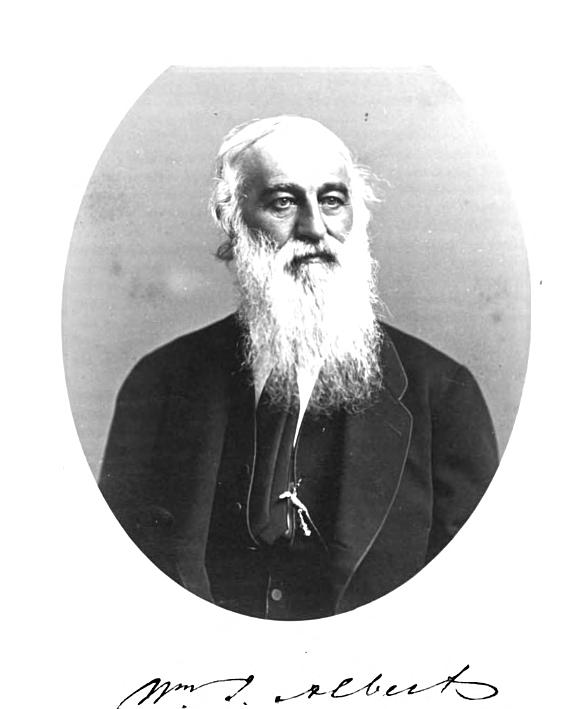

Member of the U.S. House of Representatives from Maryland's 5th district
- In office March 4, 1873 – March 3, 1875
- Preceded by: William Matthews Merrick
- Succeeded by: Eli J. Henkle

Personal details
- Born: August 4, 1816 Baltimore, Maryland, U.S.
- Died: March 29, 1879 (aged 62) Baltimore, Maryland, U.S.
- Resting place: Green Mount Cemetery
- Party: Republican
- Spouse: Emily J. Jones (m. 1838)
- Education: Mount St. Mary's College

William Julian Albert (August 4, 1816 – March 29, 1879) was a U.S. Congressman from the fifth district of Maryland, serving from 1873 to 1875.

== Early life ==
William Julian Albert was born on August 4, 1816, in Baltimore, Maryland to a family of German descent. His father was Jacob Albert. His brother was Augustus James Albert, owner of the Mount Vernon Hotel.

William Albert graduated from Mount St. Mary's College in 1833.

== Personal life ==
Albert married Emily J. Jones in 1838, daughter of Talbot Jones.

== Career ==
Albert engaged in hardware business with his father and brother from 1838 to 1855. Until 1862, Albert was a director of the Baltimore and Cuba Smelting and Mining Company. He also engaged in banking. He was a prominent Union leader in Maryland and worked to prevent the secession of the State during the American Civil War. He was also one of the founders and directors of the First National Bank of Maryland, and director of several insurance companies, savings banks, and manufacturing companies.

Albert was an unsuccessful candidate for election in 1866 to the Fortieth Congress and in 1868 to the Forty-first Congress, but was elected as a Republican to the Forty-third Congress, serving from March 4, 1873, to March 3, 1875. He was not a candidate for re-election to the Forty-fourth Congress in 1874, and resumed his former business pursuits.

Albert worked to found the Soldiers' Home and an asylum for orphans and worked to assist African American freedmen during the Reconstruction era, co-founding a school for black teachers in Baltimore.

== Death ==
Albert died in Baltimore on March 29, 1879, after suffering from Bright's disease. He is interred in Green Mount Cemetery.

U.S. House of Representatives
Preceded by William Matthews Merrick	Representative of the Fifth Congressional District of Maryland; 1873–1875	Succeeded by Eli J. Henkle
