= Stephen Warfield Gambrill =

American politician (1873-1938)

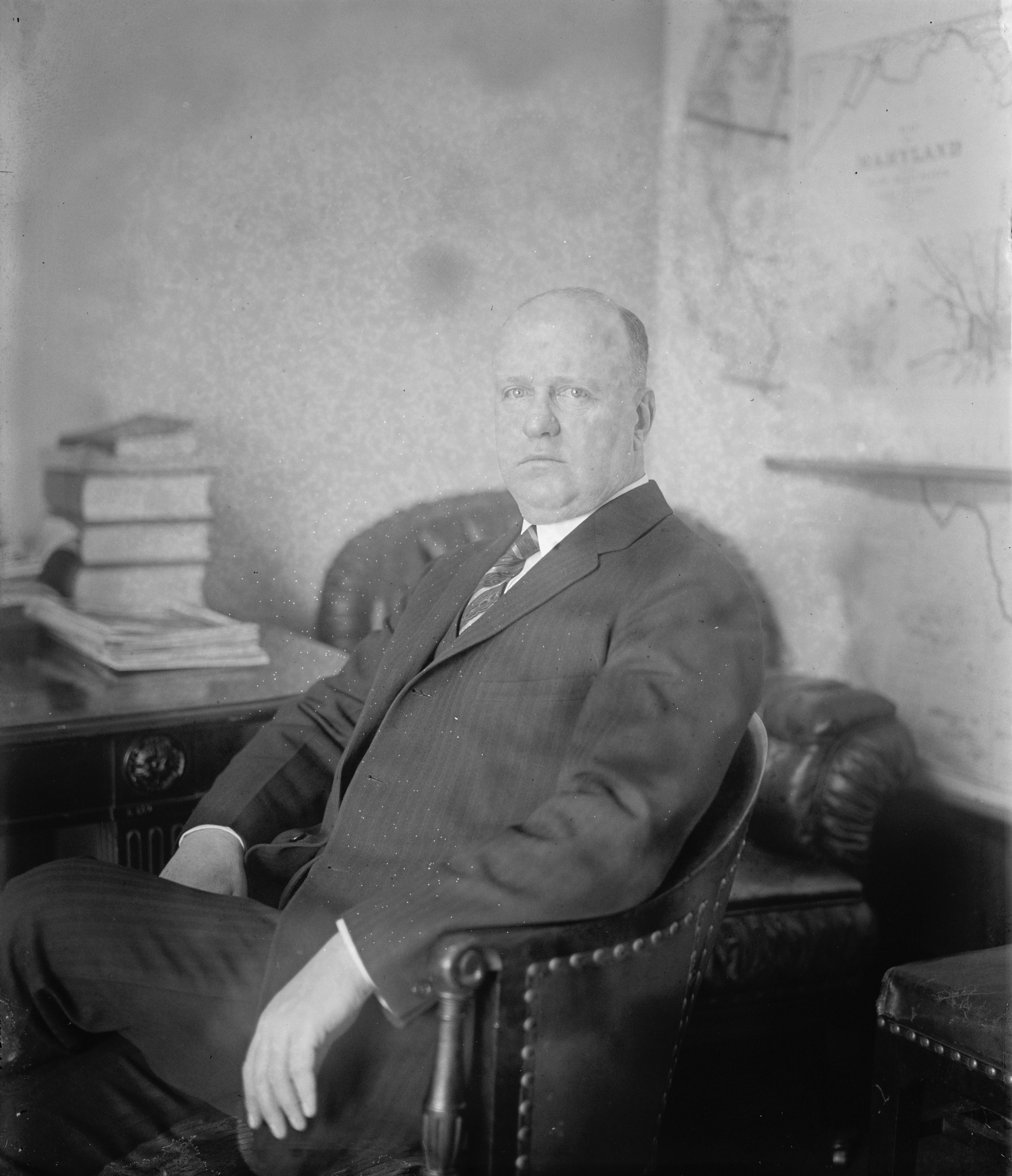
- Gambrill in 1926

Member of the U.S. House of Representatives from Maryland's 5th district
- In office November 4, 1924 – December 19, 1938
- Preceded by: Sydney Emanuel Mudd II
- Succeeded by: Lansdale Ghiselin Sasscer

Member of the Maryland Senate
- In office 1924

Member of the Maryland House of Delegates
- In office 1920-1922

Personal details
- Born: October 2, 1873 near Savage, Maryland, U.S.
- Died: December 19, 1938 (aged 65) Washington, D.C., U.S.
- Party: Democratic

Stephen Warfield Gambrill (October 2, 1873 – December 19, 1938) was an American politician.

== Early life ==
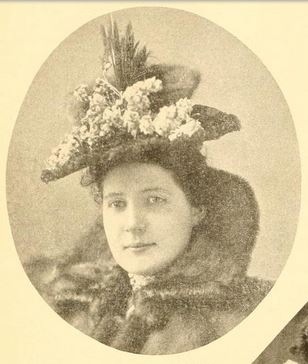
Haddie Gorman in 1895

Born near Savage, Maryland, to Stephen Gambrill and Kate (Gorman) Gambrill, he attended the common schools and Maryland Agricultural College (now the University of Maryland, College Park. He graduated from the law department of Columbian College (now The George Washington University Law School), Washington, D.C., in 1896, was admitted to the bar in 1897, and practiced in Baltimore, Maryland. In 1900, he married Haddie D. Gorman (who died in 1923).

== Career ==
Gambrill served as a member of the Maryland House of Delegates from 1920 to 1922, and served in the Maryland State Senate in 1924. He was elected from the fifth district of Maryland as a Democrat to the Sixty-eighth Congress to fill the vacancy caused by the death of Sidney E. Mudd II and was reelected to the Sixty-ninth and to the six succeeding Congresses, serving from November 4, 1924, until his death in Washington, D.C.

== Death ==
He died on December 19, 1938, and is interred in Cedar Hill Cemetery, Suitland, Maryland.

== See also ==
- List of members of the United States Congress who died in office (1900–1949)

U.S. House of Representatives
Preceded by Sydney E. Mudd II	Representative of the Fifth Congressional District of Maryland; 1924–1938	Succeeded by Lansdale Ghiselin Sasscer
