= Maryland's congressional districts =

U.S. House districts in the state of Maryland

Map of Maryland's congressional districts since 2023 Interactive map version

Maryland is divided into eight congressional districts, each represented by a member of the United States House of Representatives. After the 2020 census, the number of Maryland's seats remained unchanged, giving evidence of stable population growth relative to the United States at large.

== Current districts and representatives ==
This is a list of United States representatives from Maryland, their terms, their district boundaries, and the district political ratings according to the Cook Partisan Voting Index. The delegation has eight members, including seven Democrats and one Republican.

Current U.S. representatives from Maryland
District	Member (Residence)	Party	Incumbent since	CPVI (2025)	District map
1st	Andy Harris (Cambridge)	Republican	January 3, 2011	R+8	
2nd	Johnny Olszewski (Sparrows Point)	Democratic	January 3, 2025	D+10	
3rd	Sarah Elfreth (Annapolis)	Democratic	January 3, 2025	D+12	
4th	Glenn Ivey (Cheverly)	Democratic	January 3, 2023	D+39	
5th	Steny Hoyer (Mechanicsville)	Democratic	May 19, 1981	D+17	
6th	April McClain Delaney (Potomac)	Democratic	January 3, 2025	D+3	
7th	Kweisi Mfume (Baltimore)	Democratic	May 5, 2020	D+31	
8th	Jamie Raskin (Takoma Park)	Democratic	January 3, 2017	D+30	

== Historical district boundaries ==
Table of United States congressional district boundary maps in the State of Maryland, presented chronologically. All redistricting events that took place in Maryland between 1973 and 2013 are shown.

Year	Statewide map	Baltimore highlight
1973–1982		
1983–1992		
1993–2002		
2003–2013		
2013–2023		

== Obsolete district ==
- Maryland's at-large congressional seat

== See also ==
- List of United States congressional districts
- Maryland's congressional delegations
