= Eli Jones Henkle =

American politician

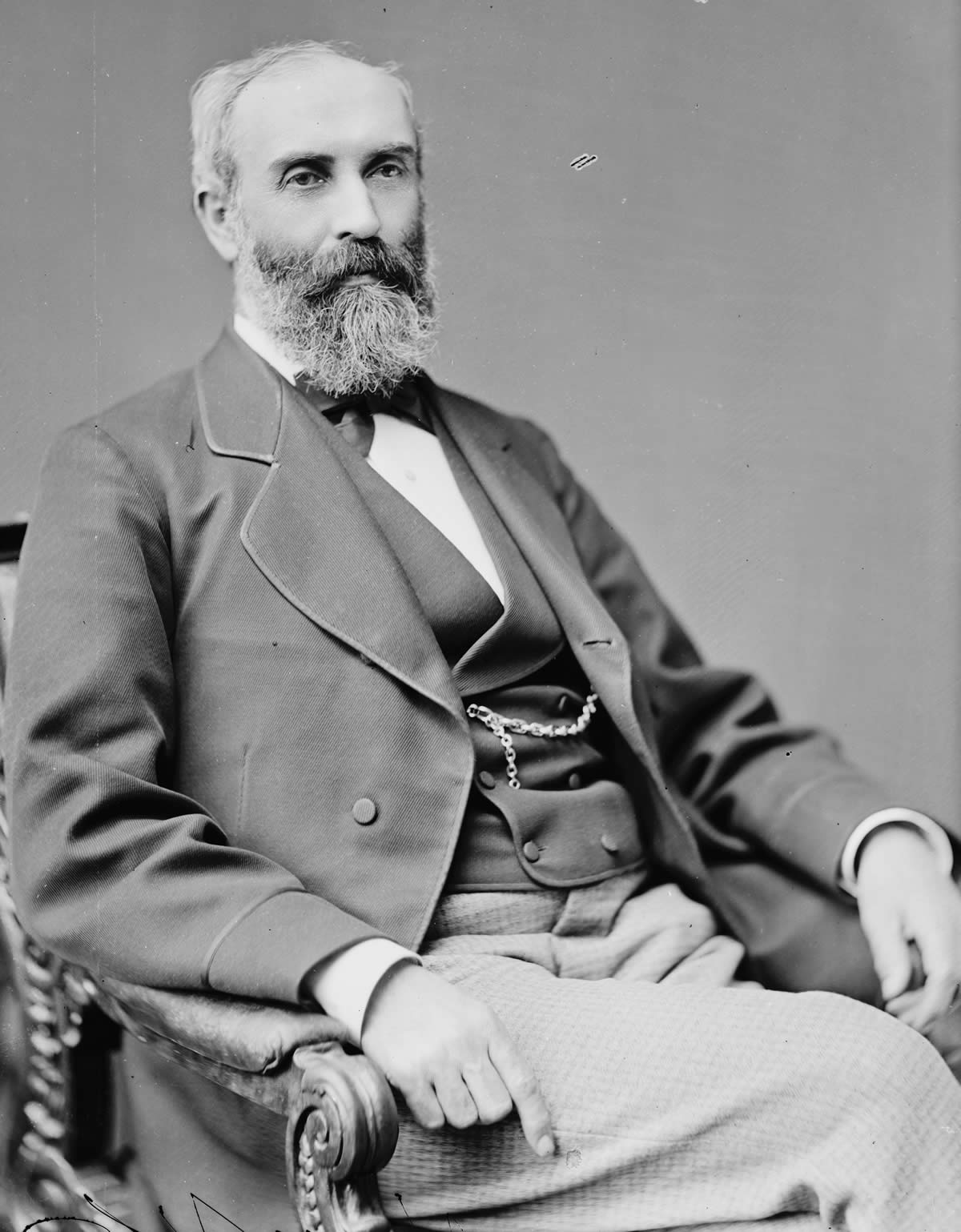
Eli J. Henkle

Eli Jones Henkle (November 24, 1828 – November 1, 1893) was a U.S. Congressman from the fifth district of Maryland, serving three terms from 1875 to 1881.

== Early life and education ==
Henkle was born in Westminster, Maryland, and completed an academic course. He taught school in Anne Arundel County, Maryland, studied medicine, and was graduated from the University of Maryland at Baltimore in 1850. He practised his profession in Brooklyn, Maryland, and became a trustee and professor at the Maryland Agricultural College at College Park, which is now the University of Maryland, College Park.

== Career ==
Henkle became a member of the Maryland House of Delegates in 1863, and served as a member of the State constitutional convention in 1864. He served in the Maryland State Senate in 1867, 1868, and 1870, and was again a member of the House of Delegates from 1872 to 1875.

In 1872, Henkle served as a delegate to the Democratic National Convention. He was elected as a Democrat to the Forty-fourth, Forty-fifth, and Forty-sixth Congresses (serving from March 4, 1875 until March 3, 1881). He was an unsuccessful candidate for reelection in 1880 to the Forty-seventh Congress, and moved to Chicago, Illinois in 1889.

== Death ==
He later returned to Baltimore, where he died in 1893. He is interred in Druid Ridge Cemetery in Baltimore.

U.S. House of Representatives
Preceded by William J. Albert	Representative of the Fifth Congressional District of Maryland; 1875–1881	Succeeded by Andrew G. Chapman
