= Hart Benton Holton =

American politician (1835–1907)

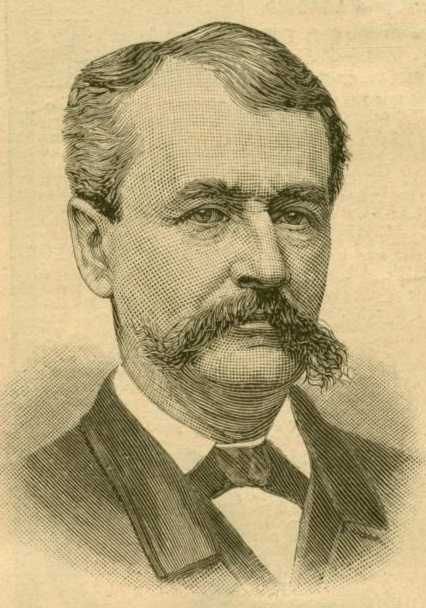

Member of the U.S. House of Representatives from Maryland's 5th district
- In office March 4, 1883 – March 3, 1885
- Preceded by: Andrew Grant Chapman
- Succeeded by: Barnes Compton

Member of the Maryland Senate from the Howard County district
- In office 1862–1867

Personal details
- Born: October 13, 1835 near Elkton, Maryland, U.S.
- Died: January 4, 1907 (aged 71) Woodlawn, Baltimore County, Maryland, U.S.
- Resting place: Loudon Park Cemetery
- Party: Unconditional Union; Republican
- Spouse: Pamelia A. Gary (m. 1861)
- Occupation: Politician; educator

Hart Benton Holton (October 13, 1835 – January 4, 1907) was an American politician from Maryland. He served in the U.S. House of Representatives and as a member of the Maryland Senate.

== Early life ==
Hart Benton Holton was born on October 13, 1835, near Elkton, Maryland, to Mary (née Alexander) and John Holton. His father emigrated from Ireland and his mother emigrated from Scotland. He attended common schools, including Blair High School in Chester County, Pennsylvania. He also attended Hopewell Academy of Chester, Pennsylvania.

== Career ==
Holton moved to Baltimore, Maryland in 1857 and taught school in Alberton, Maryland, from 1857 to 1873. He was also affiliated with the cotton manufacturing industry and mills in Alberton and was employed by James S. Gary.

Holton was a Republican. During the Civil War, he advocated for the Union cause. He served as a Unconditional Union member of the Maryland Senate, representing Howard County, from 1862 to 1867. He advocated for the passage of the charter of the Baltimore and Potomac Railroad and the State Agricultural Association. He later moved to Woodlawn, Maryland in 1873, where he engaged in the raising of blooded horses. He was elected from the fifth district of Maryland as a Republican to the Forty-eighth Congress, and served from March 4, 1883, to March 3, 1885. In 1883, he ran as the Republican nominee for the governorship of Maryland, but lost to Robert Milligan McLane. He was an unsuccessful candidate for reelection in 1884 to the Forty-ninth Congress and retired from public life, at which point he took up an interest in raising horses.

== Personal life ==
Holton married Pamelia A. Gary, daughter of James S. Gary and sister of Postmaster General James Albert Gary, on August 27, 1861. In 1876, he purchased his 430 acres (170 ha) Meadows home on Dogwood Road near Woodlawn. He purchased the stallion Orange Blossom for US$12,000 and took care of it on his property. He later purchased the stallion Bradstreet. He was a member of the Gentlemen's Driving Club and served as a judge at club races.

Holton died of a heart ailment at his Meadows home in Woodlawn on January 4, 1907. He was interred in Loudon Park Cemetery of Baltimore, Maryland.

Party political offices
Preceded by James Albert Gary	Republican nominee for Governor of Maryland; 1883	Succeeded by Walter B. Brooks
U.S. House of Representatives
Preceded by Andrew Grant Chapman	Representative of the 5th Congressional District of Maryland; 1883–1885	Succeeded by Barnes Compton
