= William Matthews Merrick =

American judge

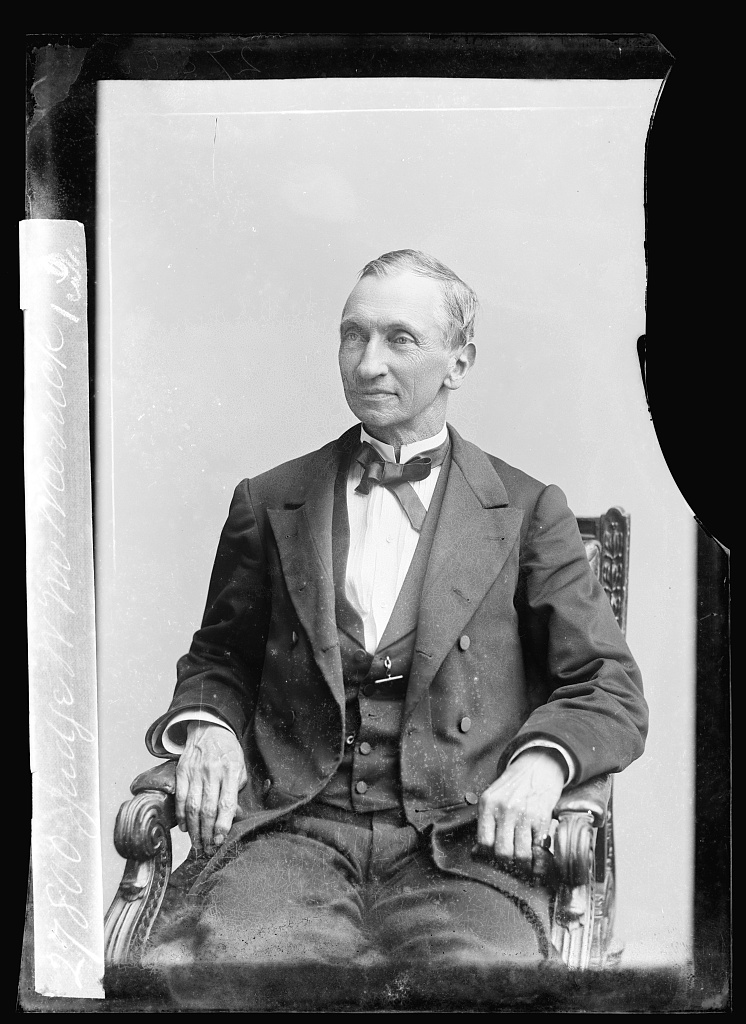

Associate Justice of the Supreme Court of the District of Columbia
- In office May 1, 1885 – February 4, 1889
- Appointed by: Grover Cleveland
- Preceded by: Andrew Wylie
- Succeeded by: Andrew Coyle Bradley

Member of the U.S. House of Representatives from Maryland's 5th district
- In office March 4, 1871 – March 3, 1873
- Preceded by: Frederick Stone
- Succeeded by: William Albert

Judge of the United States Circuit Court of the District of Columbia
- In office December 14, 1855 – March 3, 1863
- Appointed by: Franklin Pierce
- Preceded by: James Dunlop
- Succeeded by: Seat abolished

Personal details
- Born: William Matthews Merrick; September 1, 1818 Faulkner, Maryland, U.S.
- Died: February 4, 1889 (aged 70) Washington, D.C., U.S.
- Resting place: Oak Hill Cemetery; Washington, D.C., U.S.
- Party: Democratic
- Relations: Charles A. Wickliffe
- Parent: William Duhurst Merrick (father)
- Relatives: Richard T. Merrick; William Matthews
- Education: Georgetown University; University of Virginia read law

William Matthews Merrick (September 1, 1818 – February 4, 1889) was a United States circuit judge of the United States Circuit Court of the District of Columbia, a United States representative from Maryland and an associate justice of the Supreme Court of the District of Columbia.

== Education and career ==
Born on September 1, 1818, near Faulkner, Charles County, Maryland, Merrick was the son of William Dunhurst Merrick and his wife. He graduated from Georgetown College in 1831, studied law at the University of Virginia, and read law in 1839 to prepare for the bar.

Merrick admitted to the bar and entered private practice in Baltimore, Maryland from 1839 to 1844. He continued private practice in Frederick, Maryland from 1844 to 1854. He served as deputy attorney general for Frederick County, Maryland from 1845 to 1859. He resumed private practice in Washington, D.C. from 1854 to 1855.

== Circuit Court service ==
Merrick was nominated by President Franklin Pierce on December 14, 1855, to a seat on the United States Circuit Court of the District of Columbia vacated by Judge James Dunlop. He was confirmed by the United States Senate on December 14, 1855, and received his commission the same day. His service terminated on March 3, 1863, due to abolition of the court.

=== Civil War and removal from office ===
While a circuit judge, Merrick is best known for his role in the case of United States ex rel. Murphy v. Porter during the American Civil War. On October 21, 1861, he was placed under house arrest by General Andrew Porter in relation to a writ for habeas corpus concerning a soldier stationed in Washington, D.C. That same day, President Abraham Lincoln ordered Secretary of State William H. Seward to suspend Merrick's salary. Though there is some debate if Merrick was actually confined to his home, guards were removed in mid-November.

In 1863, his name came up in discussions by the United States Senate over whether to abolish the D.C. Circuit Court, with opponents of the bill claiming that it was a stratagem to turn Merrick and his fellow judges out of office. Senator Henry Wilson claimed that Merrick's heart "sweltered with treason" and that his house had become a hotbed of pro-secessionist sympathizers.

== Later career ==
Merrick resumed private practice in Howard County, Maryland from 1863 to 1870. He was a senior Professor of Law for Columbian College (now George Washington University) in Washington, D.C. from 1866 to 1867. He was a delegate to the Maryland state constitutional convention in 1867. He was a member of the Maryland House of Delegates in 1870.

== Congressional service ==
Merrick was elected as a Democrat from Maryland's 5th congressional district to the United States House of Representatives of the 42nd United States Congress, serving from March 4, 1871, to March 3, 1873. He was an unsuccessful candidate for reelection to the 43rd United States Congress in 1872. After his departure from Congress, Merrick resumed private practice in Howard County from 1873 to 1886.

== Supreme Court of the District of Columbia service ==
Merrick received a recess appointment from President Grover Cleveland on May 1, 1885, to an Associate Justice seat on the Supreme Court of the District of Columbia (now the United States District Court for the District of Columbia) vacated by Associate Justice Andrew Wylie. He was nominated to the same position by President Cleveland on December 14, 1885. He was confirmed by the United States Senate on March 30, 1886, and received his commission the same day. His service terminated on February 4, 1889, due to his death in Washington, D.C. He was initially interred in Mount Olivet Cemetery in Washington, D.C. and re-interred in Oak Hill Cemetery in Washington, D.C.

== Family ==
Merrick was the son of William Duhurst Merrick, a United States senator from Maryland. His uncle, William Matthews, was the President of Georgetown College. In 1849, Merrick married Mary Wickliffe, the daughter of Charles A. Wickliffe.

== Sources ==
- United States Congress. "William Matthews Merrick (id: M000655)". Biographical Directory of the United States Congress.
- William Matthews Merrick at the Biographical Directory of Federal Judges, a publication of the Federal Judicial Center.

U.S. House of Representatives
Preceded by Frederick Stone	Member of the United States House of Representatives from Maryland's 5th congressional district 1871–1873	Succeeded by William Albert
Legal offices
Preceded by James Dunlop	Judge of the United States Circuit Court of the District of Columbia; 1855–1863	Succeeded by Seat abolished
Preceded by Andrew Wylie	Associate Justice of the Supreme Court of the District of Columbia; 1885–1889	Succeeded by Andrew Coyle Bradley
