= Barnes Compton =

American politician (1830–1898)

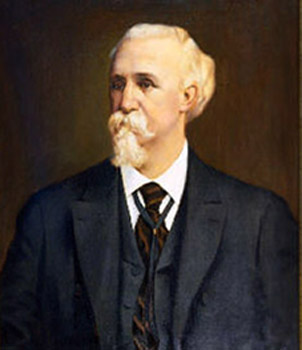

Member of the U.S. House of Representatives from Maryland's 5th district
- In office 1891–1894
- Preceded by: Sydney Emanuel Mudd I
- Succeeded by: Charles E. Coffin

Member of the U.S. House of Representatives from Maryland's 5th district
- In office 1885–1890
- Preceded by: Hart B. Holton
- Succeeded by: Sydney Emanuel Mudd I

Treasurer of Maryland
- In office 1874–1885
- Governor: William Pinkney Whyte; James Black Groome; John Lee Carroll; William T. Hamilton; Robert Milligan McLane
- Preceded by: John W. Davis
- Succeeded by: John Sterett Gittings

President of the Maryland State Senate
- In office 1868–1870
- Preceded by: Christopher C. Cox
- Succeeded by: Henry Snyder

Member of the Maryland Senate
- In office 1867–1872

Member of the Maryland House of Delegates
- In office 1860–1861

Personal details
- Born: November 16, 1830 Port Tobacco, Maryland
- Died: December 2, 1898 (aged 68) Laurel, Maryland
- Resting place: Loudon Park Cemetery
- Party: Whig; Democrat
- Spouse: Margaret Holiday Sothoron (m. 1858)
- Children: 6
- Education: Princeton College (A.B.)

Barnes Compton (November 16, 1830 – December 2, 1898) was a Representative of the fifth congressional district of Maryland and a Treasurer of Maryland.

== Early life ==
Barnes Compton was born on November 16, 1830, in Port Tobacco, Charles County, Maryland to Mary Clarissa (née Barnes) and William Penn Compton. His parents both died when he was young, and he was raised until 1843 by his grandfather, John Barnes. He attended the Charlotte Hall Military Academy in St. Mary's County, Maryland for his formal education, and graduated from Princeton College with a bachelor's degree in June 1851. At a young age, he became the second largest slaveholder in Charles County.

== Career ==
After college, Compton returned home and engaged in agricultural pursuits and as a planter. He first ran for the State House of Delegates under the Whig ticket in 1855, but lost. He re-ran in 1859 as a Democrat and served as a member of the State House of Delegates in 1860 and 1861.

In the 1861 session, held in Frederick, a number of legislative members were suspected of Confederate sympathies and were arrested upon arrival in Frederick. Compton evaded arrest by fleeing across the Potomac. In 1865, Compton was arrested and imprisoned at the Old Capitol under suspicion of aiding and abetting John Wilkes Booth after the Lincoln Assassination, but the information was proven false and he was released after four days.

He was also a member of the State Senate in 1867, 1868, 1870, and 1872, during the 1868 and 1870 sessions he served as the Senate president in 1868. Compton also served as State Tobacco Inspector in 1873 and 1874 and as Treasurer of Maryland from 1874 to 1885.

Compton then moved to Laurel in Prince George's County, Maryland in 1880 and was elected as a Democrat to the Forty-ninth and Fiftieth United States Congress (March 4, 1885 – March 3, 1889). He presented credentials as Member-elect to the Fifty-first United States Congress and served from March 4, 1889, to March 20, 1890, when he was succeeded by Sydney E. Mudd, Sr., who contested the election. A committee was appointed to investigate voter fraud and ruled in favor of Mudd. Compton was later elected to the Fifty-second and Fifty-third United States Congress and served from March 4, 1891, until his resignation, effective May 15, 1894 when he was then appointed by President Grover Cleveland as Naval Officer of the Port of Baltimore, a post in which he served from 1894 to 1898.

Compton taught agriculture at the Maryland Agricultural College. He also sat on the board of trustees for the Charlotte Hall Military Academy, the School Commission of Charles County, and the Maryland Hospital for the Insane. In 1890, he was a cofounder and appointed director of the Citizens National Bank of Laurel. In 1898, he was made president of the Guarantee Building and Loan Association of Baltimore.

== Personal life ==
He married Margaret Holiday Sothoron of St. Mary's County on October 27, 1858. Together, they had four sons and two daughters:

- John Henry Sothoron Compton
- Key Compton
- William Penn Compton
- Barnes Compton
- Mary Barnes Compton
- Elizabeth Somerville

He was the great-grandson of Philip Key. He was a friend of Arthur Pue Gorman.

== Death ==
Compton died on December 2, 1898, of paralysis in Laurel, Maryland. He was interred in Loudon Park Cemetery in Baltimore.

Political offices
Preceded by Christopher C. Cox	President of the Maryland State Senate; 1868–1870	Succeeded by Henry Snyder
Preceded by John W. Davis	Treasurer of Maryland; 1874—1885	Succeeded by John Sterett Gittings
U.S. House of Representatives
Preceded by Hart B. Holton	Representative of the Fifth Congressional District of Maryland; 1885—1890	Succeeded by Sydney Emanuel Mudd I
Preceded by Sydney Emanuel Mudd I	Representative of the Fifth Congressional District of Maryland; 1891—1894	Succeeded by Charles E. Coffin
