= Charles E. Coffin =

American politician (1841–1912)

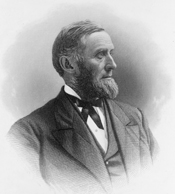

Member of the U.S. House of Representatives from Maryland's 5th district
- In office November 6, 1894 – March 3, 1897
- Preceded by: Barnes Compton
- Succeeded by: Sydney Emanuel Mudd I

Member of the Maryland Senate
- In office 1890–1894

Member of the Maryland House of Delegates
- In office 1884–1886

Personal details
- Born: Charles Edward Coffin; July 18, 1841 Boston, Massachusetts, U.S.
- Died: May 24, 1912 (aged 70) Muirkirk, Maryland, U.S.
- Resting place: St. John's Episcopal Church Cemetery
- Party: Republican
- Spouse: Mary Kate
- Children: 7

Charles Edward Coffin (July 18, 1841 – May 24, 1912), was an American industrialist and Republican politician who moved to Maryland during the American Civil War to operate ironworks near the national capital, and later served in both houses of the Maryland legislature as well as the United States House of Representatives.

== Early life and education ==
Charles Edward Coffin was born on July 18, 1841 in Boston, Massachusetts, descended from numerous long-settled elite New England families. He attended the Boston grammar and high schools.

In 1863, he relocated to Maryland and settled at Muikirk, where he purchased a tract of land. He discovered iron ore in the property and established iron works for its development.

== Career ==
In 1863, during the American Civil War, federal authorities hired Coffin's ironworks in Muirkirk, Prince George's County, Maryland to ensure they did not fall into Confederate hands. The Muirkirk Foundry Company manufactured pig iron and later upgraded to blast furnaces. Despite his legislative service described below, Coffin served as its president until his death. After the war many of its laborers were freedmen, who founded an independent black community sometimes known as Rossville (or "Swampoodle"), with its historic black Queen's Chapel and Burial Ground established in 1868.

Coffin first won election to the Maryland House of Delegates in 1884 and served until 1886. In 1890 he won election to the Maryland State Senate, and served from 1890 to 1894. He was a state delegate to the Republican National Convention in 1892.

In 1894, voters from Maryland's 5th congressional district elected Coffin as a Republican to the Fifty-third Congress to fill the vacancy caused by the resignation of Democrat Barnes Compton. He was re-elected to the Fifty-fourth Congress and served from November 6, 1894, to March 3, 1897.

== Personal life ==
He was married to Mary Kate. Together, they had one son and six daughters.

== Death ==
Coffin suffered a stroke in his final years and died in Muirkirk on May 24, 1912. He was interred in St. John's Episcopal Church Cemetery in Beltsville, Maryland.

U.S. House of Representatives
Preceded by Barnes Compton	Representative of the 5th Congressional District of Maryland; 1894–1897	Succeeded by Sydney Emanuel Mudd I
