= James Dunlop (judge) =

American judge (1793–1872)

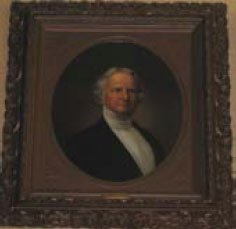

Chief Judge of the United States Circuit Court of the District of Columbia
- In office November 27, 1855 – March 3, 1863
- Appointed by: Franklin Pierce
- Preceded by: William Cranch
- Succeeded by: Seat abolished

Judge of the United States Circuit Court of the District of Columbia
- In office October 3, 1845 – November 27, 1855
- Appointed by: James K. Polk
- Preceded by: Buckner Thruston
- Succeeded by: William Matthew Merrick

Personal details
- Born: James Dunlop; March 28, 1793 Georgetown, Maryland
- Died: May 6, 1872 (aged 79) Georgetown, D.C.
- Education: Princeton University (A.B.) read law

James Dunlop (March 28, 1793 – May 6, 1872) was a United States Circuit Judge and later Chief United States Circuit Judge of the United States Circuit Court of the District of Columbia.

== Education and career ==
Dunlop was born in Georgetown, which at that time was in that portion of the State of Maryland ceded to the federal government pursuant to the Residence Act of 1790 but which remained under the jurisdiction of Maryland until the enactment of the District of Columbia Organic Act of 1801. He received an Artium Baccalaureus degree in 1811 from the College of New Jersey (now Princeton University) and read law. He was Secretary of the Corporation of Georgetown, D.C. until 1838. He was a Judge of the Criminal Court of the District of Columbia from 1838 to 1845.

== Federal judicial service ==
Dunlop received a recess appointment from President James K. Polk on October 3, 1845, to a Judge seat on the United States Circuit Court of the District of Columbia vacated by Judge Buckner Thruston. He was nominated to the same position by President Polk on December 23, 1845. He was confirmed by the United States Senate on February 3, 1846, and received his commission the same day. His service terminated on November 27, 1855, due to his elevation to be Chief Judge of the same court.

Dunlop received a recess appointment from President Franklin Pierce on November 27, 1855, to the Chief Judge seat on the United States Circuit Court of the District of Columbia vacated by Chief Judge William Cranch. He was nominated to the same position by President Pierce on December 3, 1855. He was confirmed by the Senate on December 7, 1855, and received his commission the same day. His service terminated on March 3, 1863, due to abolition of the court, pursuant to 12 Stat. 762. The court was superseded by the Supreme Court of the District of Columbia (now the United States District Court for the District of Columbia).

== Later career and death ==
Following his departure from the federal bench, Dunlop resumed private practice in Georgetown, D.C. from 1863 to 1872. He died in Georgetown on May 6, 1872.

== Sources ==
Legal offices
Preceded by Buckner Thruston	Judge of the United States Circuit Court of the District of Columbia; 1845–1855	Succeeded by William Matthews Merrick
Preceded by William Cranch	Chief Judge of the United States Circuit Court of the District of Columbia; 1855–1863	Succeeded by Seat abolished
