= Blair Lee I =

American politician (1857–1944)

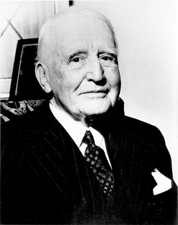

United States Senator from Maryland
- In office January 28, 1914 – March 3, 1917
- Preceded by: William P. Jackson
- Succeeded by: Joseph I. France

Member of the Maryland Senate from Montgomery County
- In office November 7, 1905 – November 4, 1913
- Preceded by: Spencer C. Jones
- Succeeded by: Eugene J. Jones

Personal details
- Born: Francis Preston Blair Lee; August 9, 1857 Silver Spring, Maryland, U.S.
- Died: December 25, 1944 (aged 87) Norwood, Maryland. U.S.
- Resting place: Rock Creek Cemetery; Washington, D.C., U.S.
- Party: Democratic
- Children: E. Brooke Lee
- Parents: Samuel Phillips Lee (father); Elizabeth Blair Lee (mother)
- Relatives: Lee family

Francis Preston Blair Lee (August 9, 1857 – December 25, 1944) was an American politician serving as a Democratic member of the United States Senate, representing the State of Maryland from 1914 to 1917. He was also the great-grandson of American patriot Richard Henry Lee, and grandfather of Acting Governor of Maryland Blair Lee III. Lee was named after his maternal grandfather, Francis Preston Blair.

== Life and career ==
Lee was born in Silver Spring, Maryland, and attended the common schools in the area. He was the son of Samuel Phillips Lee and his wife, the former Elizabeth Blair. He graduated from Princeton University in 1880 and from the law department of Columbian (now George Washington) University in 1882. He was admitted to the bar of the District of Columbia and of Montgomery County, Maryland in 1883 and commenced practice in Maryland.

Lee was an unsuccessful candidate for election to the Fifty-fifth Congress in 1896. He was, however, elected to the Maryland State Senate, and served from 1905 to 1913. In 1911, he ran for the position of Governor of Maryland, but lost the Democratic nomination to Arthur Pue Gorman Jr. (who lost to Republican candidate Phillips Lee Goldsborough). In 1915, he again ran for Governor and was defeated in the Democratic Primary by eventual winner Emerson Harrington.

Following his defeat in the gubernatorial election, Lee was elected to the United States Senate in a special election on November 4, 1913, to fill the vacancy caused by the death of senator Isidor Rayner. Because the Seventeenth Amendment to the United States Constitution had recently gone into effect, Lee became the second U.S. Senator directly elected by the people of a state under the Constitution's provisions (although other states had previously elected senators indirectly through popular elections, which were then ratified by the state legislature). He presented his credentials to serve as senator on December 5, 1913, but he did not qualify until January 28, 1914 because the incumbent in his seat, Republican William P. Jackson, claimed that "since he had been appointed under the original constitutional provision, he was entitled to hold his seat until the regularly scheduled adjournment date of the Maryland state assembly."

The Senate considered Jackson's challenge but eventually rejected it and seated Lee. While senator, Lee was chairman of the Committee on Expenditures in the Post Office Department, and a member of the Committee on Coast Defenses (Sixty-third and Sixty-fourth Congresses). He was unsuccessful in his bid for re-election in 1916, losing the Democratic nomination to David John Lewis (who went on to lose to Joseph I. France).

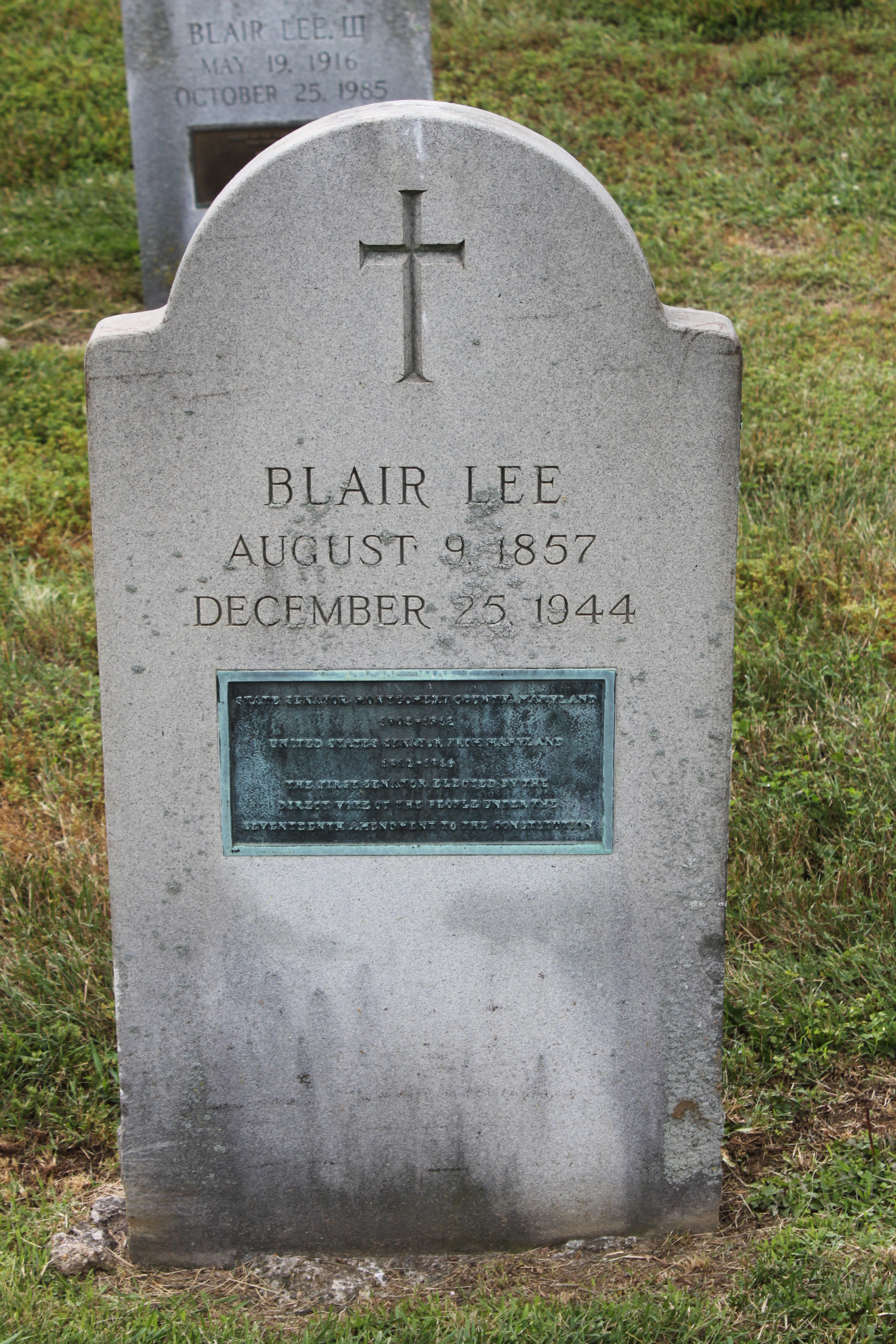
Grave of Lee at Rock Creek Cemetery

Lee resumed the practice of law after he left the Senate. He died in Norwood, Maryland, and is buried in Rock Creek Cemetery in Washington, D.C.

Party political offices
First	Democratic nominee for U.S. Senator from Maryland (Class 1); 1913	Succeeded by David John Lewis
U.S. Senate
Preceded by William P. Jackson	U.S. senator (Class 1) from Maryland; 1914–1917; Served alongside: John Walter Smith	Succeeded by Joseph Irwin France
