= Charlotte Hall Military Academy =

Former school in Maryland, U.S.

- Seal of Charlotte Hall Military Academy
- Other name: CHMA
- Former name: Charlotte Hall School
- Type: Private
- Active: 1774–1976
- Affiliations: Non-sectarian
- Location: Charlotte Hall, Maryland, United States; 38.477569°N 76.779128°W
- Campus: Rural 360 acres (1.5 km2)
- Colours
- Nickname: Cadets

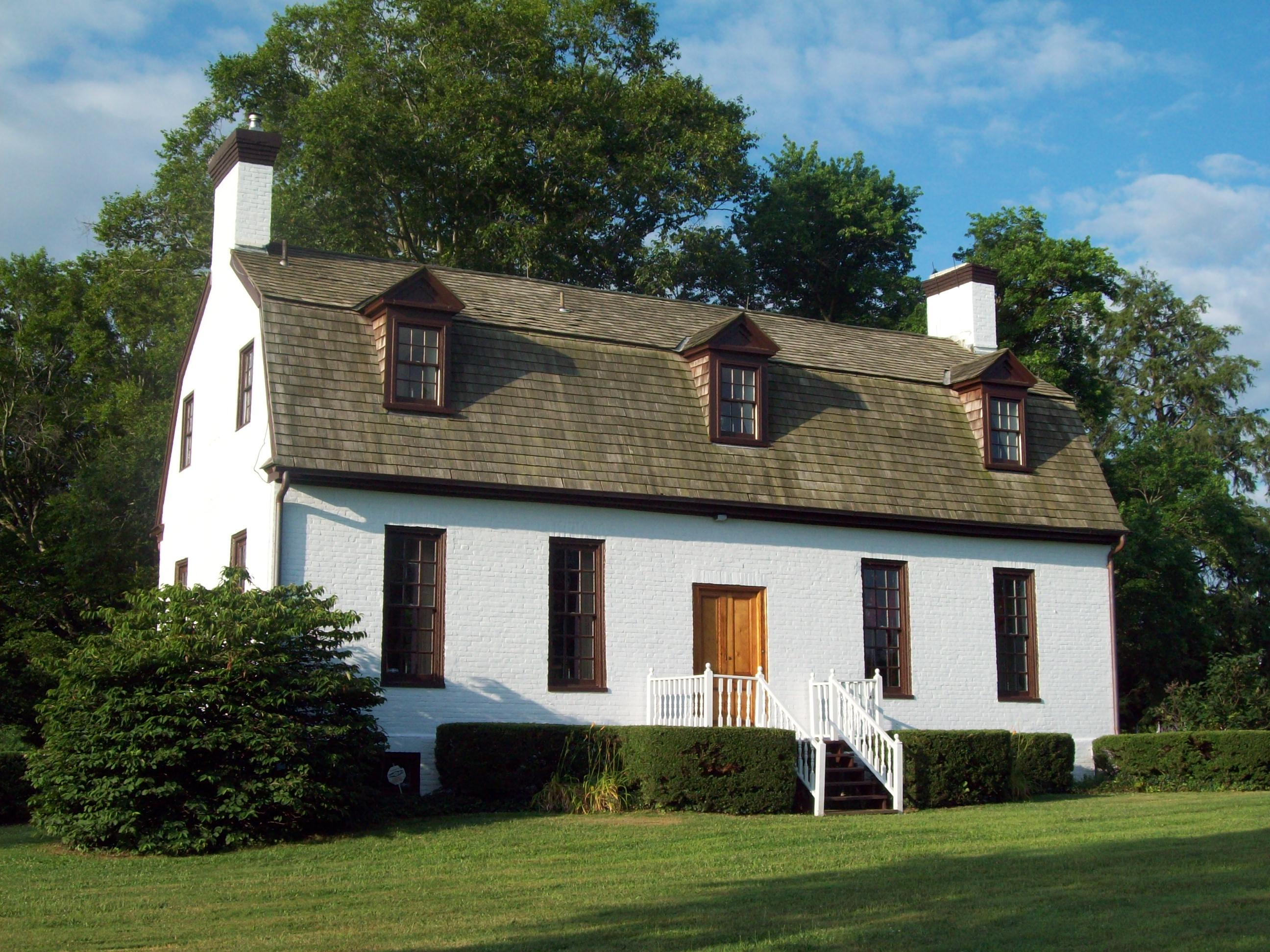
Charlotte Hall Historic District, White House, July 2009

Charlotte Hall Military Academy, located at Charlotte Hall, Maryland, was established as Charlotte Hall School in 1774 by Queen Charlotte to provide for the liberal and pious education of youth to better fit them for the discharge of their duties for the British Empire. It was fully accredited by the Maryland State Department of Education.

The landed estate of the school embraced 360 acres (1.5 km^{2}). The School was non-sectarian and of high moral tone. There were many illustrious graduates, persons of all major professions, clergy and congressmen.

Trustees of the academy, formerly known as Charlotte Hall School, included Roger B. Taney (1777–1864) Supreme Court Justice, George Plater (1735–1792) Governor of Maryland, James Thomas (1785–1845) Governor of Maryland and Joseph Kent (1779–1837) Governor of Maryland.

The School closed its doors in 1976 because of increasing financial problems. The property is now part of the Charlotte Hall Historic District. It is operated as the Charlotte Hall Veterans Home, a program of the Maryland State Department of Veterans Affairs.

== Notable alumni ==
- Edward Bates (1793–1869), United States Attorney General under Abraham Lincoln
- James A. C. Bond, justice of the Maryland Court of Appeals
- Robert Bowie (1750–1818), Governor of Maryland
- John Buchanan (1772–1844) Chief Justice of the Maryland Court of Appeals
- León Febres Cordero (1931–2008), President of Ecuador
- Barnes Compton (1830–1896), congressman and Treasurer from Maryland.
- J. Wilmer Cronin (1896–1982), politician and lawyer from Maryland
- William Barton Wade Dent (1806–1855), congressman from Georgia
- David Herold (1842–1865), One of the Lincoln Assassination Conspirators
- Daniel Jenifer (1791–1855), congressman from Maryland and U.S. Minister to the Austrian Empire
- John Thomson Mason (1787–1850)
- John T. McKinney (1785–1837), Justice of the Indiana Supreme Court
- Thomas Parran Sr. (1860–1955), Maryland congressman, State Delegate and State senator
- Thomas Parran, Surgeon General of the United States from 1936 to 1948
- William B. Rochester (1789–1838)
- Admiral Raphael Semmes (1809–1877), captain CSS Alabama
- John Stuart Skinner (1788–1851), lawyer, publisher, and editor. Associated with Francis Scott Key.
- Sylvester Stallone (born 1946), attended in 1961
- Owsley Stanley (1935–2011), Underground LSD cook, sound man and financier for the Grateful Dead
- James Thomas (1785–1845), Governor of Maryland
- Richard Thomas (Zarvona) (1833–1875)
- George Watterston (1783–1854), third Librarian of Congress
- John F. Wood Jr. (1936–2023), member Maryland House of Delegates
