= Sydney Emanuel Mudd II =

American congressman from Maryland (1885–1924)

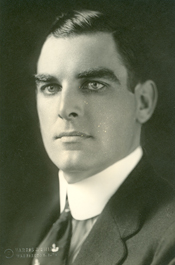

Member of the U.S. House of Representatives from Maryland's 5th district
- In office March 4, 1915 – October 11, 1924
- Preceded by: Frank O. Smith
- Succeeded by: Stephen W. Gambrill

Personal details
- Born: June 20, 1885 Gallant Green, Charles County, Maryland, U.S.
- Died: October 11, 1924 (aged 39) Baltimore, Maryland, U.S.
- Resting place: St. Ignatius’ Catholic Church Cemetery
- Party: Republican
- Relations: Sydney Emanuel Mudd
- Education: Georgetown University (BA, LLB)
- Occupation: Lawyer

Sydney Emanuel Mudd II (June 20, 1885 – October 11, 1924) was an American attorney and politician who served as the U.S. representative for Maryland's 5th congressional district from 1915 until his death in 1924. He was a member of the Republican Party.

== Early life and education ==
Sydney Emanuel Mudd, Jr. was born on June 20, 1885, at his parents' plantation in Gallant Green, Charles County, Maryland, Mudd was the son of Ida (née Griffin) and Sydney Emanuel Mudd, who became a U.S. Congressman. He was raised Catholic, attending the public schools of Charles County and the District of Columbia. He moved with his parents to La Plata, Maryland, in 1896. He graduated from Georgetown University in 1906 with a B.A., and from its law school in 1909 with a Bachelor of Laws degree.

== Law career ==
Mudd was admitted to the bar in 1910 in Maryland and Washington, D.C. He served as professor of criminal law at Georgetown University Law School in 1910.

Like his father, Mudd joined the Republican Party. He was appointed assistant district attorney of the District of Columbia, a federal position, in February 1911.

== Political career ==
Mudd's father had told him he would not be seeking re-election, and his last term as Congressman ended in March 1911. Mudd II resigned as assistant district attorney in March 1911 to campaign for the seat as U.S. Congressman from Maryland's 5th congressional district. Mudd did not win the Republican nomination in 1912 to run for election to the Sixty-third Congress. He was reappointed assistant district attorney in July 1912.

In March 1914, Mudd resigned again to become a candidate for Congress. He was elected in 1914 from the fifth district of Maryland as a Republican to the Sixty-fourth Congress and to the four succeeding Congresses, serving from March 4, 1915, until his death.

== Death ==
He died at Johns Hopkins Hospital in Baltimore, Maryland from illness on October 11, 1924. He is interred in St. Ignatius’ Catholic Church Cemetery at Chapel Point near La Plata, where his father was also buried.

== See also ==
- List of members of the United States Congress who died in office (1900–1949)

U.S. House of Representatives
Preceded by Frank Owens Smith	Representative of the 5th Congressional District of Maryland; 1915–1924	Succeeded by Stephen Warfield Gambrill
