= Thomas Parran Sr. =

American politician

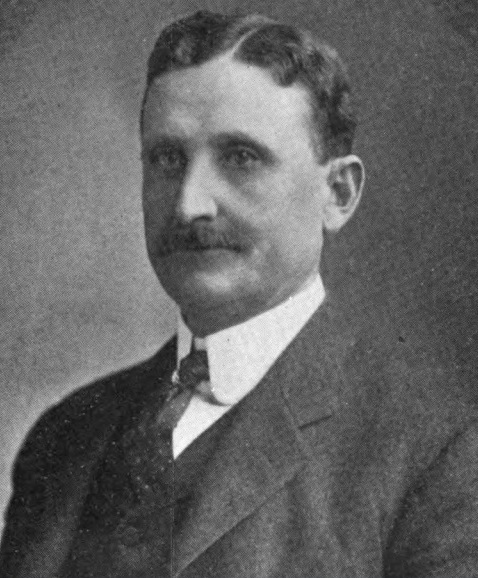

Member of the U.S. House of Representatives from Maryland's 5th district
- In office March 4, 1911 – March 3, 1913
- Preceded by: Sydney Emanuel Mudd I
- Succeeded by: Frank Owens Smith

Member of the Maryland Senate
- In office 1892-1894

Member of the Maryland House of Delegates
- In office 1884-1888

Personal details
- Born: February 12, 1860 near St. Leonard, Maryland, U.S.
- Died: March 29, 1955 (aged 95) St. Leonard, Maryland, U.S.
- Party: Republican

Thomas Parran (February 12, 1860 – March 29, 1955) was an American politician.

== Biography ==
Born near St. Leonard, Maryland, Parran attended the public schools and Charlotte Hall Military Academy. He was a member of the Maryland House of Delegates from 1884 to 1888, and served as chief deputy collector for the Bureau of Internal Revenue for the Baltimore district from 1889 to 1893. He engaged in farming at St. Leonard in 1890, and served in the Maryland State Senate from 1892 to 1894. He was the assistant enrolling clerk (1895–1897) and index clerk (1897–1901) of the House of Representatives. He was also clerk of the Maryland Court of Appeals from 1901 to 1907.

Parran served as delegate to the Republican National Conventions of 1888, 1904, and 1908. He was elected from the fifth district of Maryland as a Republican to the Sixty-second Congress, and served from March 4, 1911, to March 3, 1913. He was an unsuccessful candidate for reelection in 1912 to the Sixty-third Congress, and an unsuccessful candidate for the U.S. Senate in a 1913 special election.

Parran served as a member of the Maryland Road Commission from 1913 to 1916 and as Immigration Commissioner in 1917 and 1918. He resumed farming interests, and served as a member of the board of directors of the County Trust Company in Prince Frederick, Maryland. His name is engraved on the Hanover Street Bridge, Baltimore. He died in St. Leonard, and is interred in Christ Church Cemetery of Port Republic, Maryland.

Party political offices
| First | Republican nominee for U.S. Senator from Maryland (Class 1); 1913 | Succeeded by Joseph I. France |
U.S. House of Representatives
| Preceded by Sydney Emanuel Mudd I | Representative of the 5th congressional district of Maryland; 1911–1913 | Succeeded by Frank Owens Smith |
