= Charlotte Hall Historic District =

Historic district in Maryland, United States

- U.S. National Register of Historic Places
- U.S. Historic district
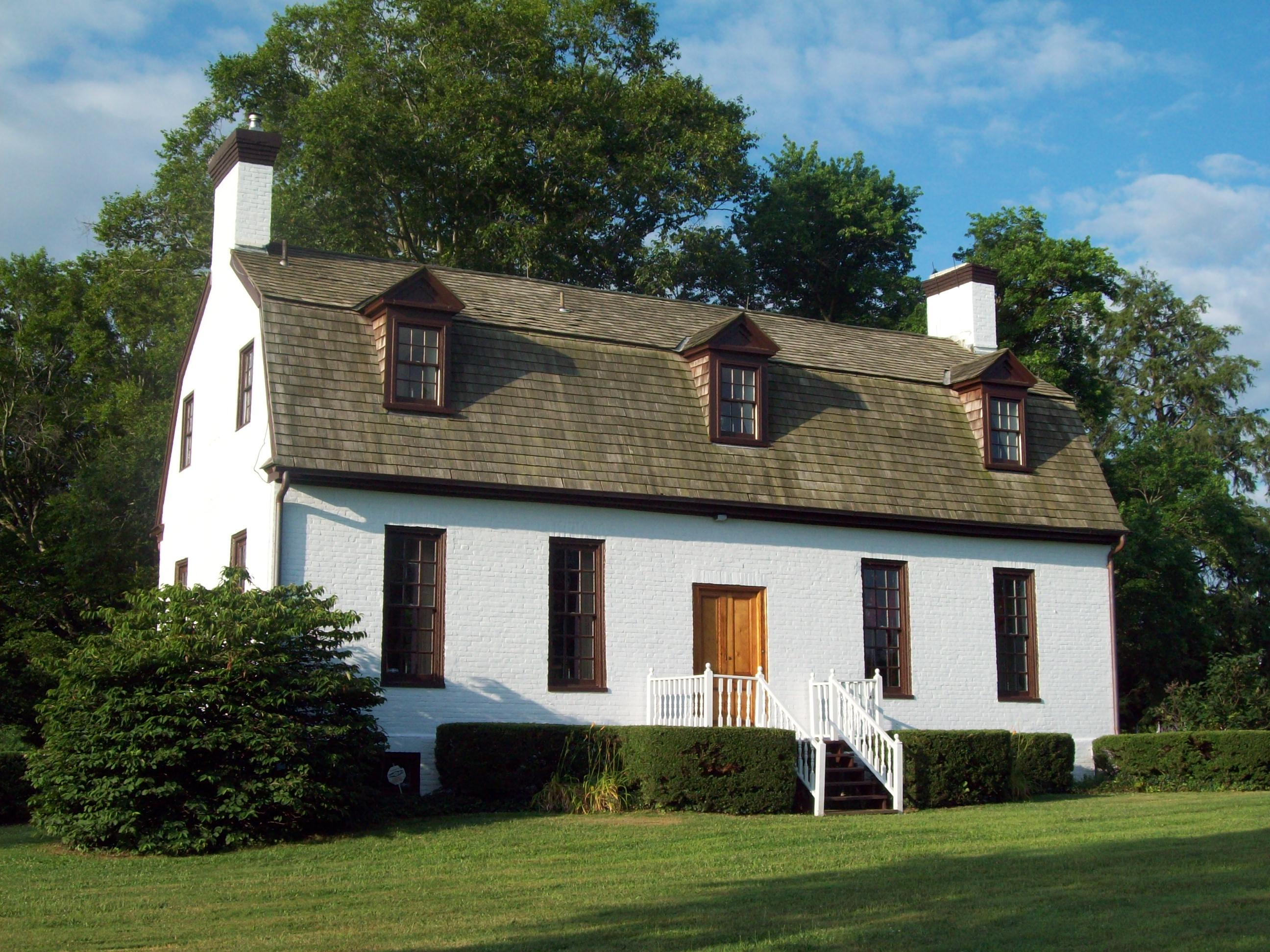
- Charlotte Hall Historic District, White House, July 2009

- Location within Maryland Location within the United States
- Nearest city: Charlotte Hall, Maryland
- Coordinates: 38°28′39″N 76°46′35″W
- Architectural style: Colonial Revival, Gothic, Federal
- NRHP reference No.: 75002085
- Added to NRHP: May 2, 1975

Charlotte Hall Historic District is a national historic district in Charlotte Hall, St. Mary's County, Maryland. It encompasses a small village along "Old Route 5." It includes 13 recorded buildings and sites of historic and/or architectural interest as well as the main campus of the Charlotte Hall Military Academy.

It was added to the National Register of Historic Places in 1975.

== Gallery ==
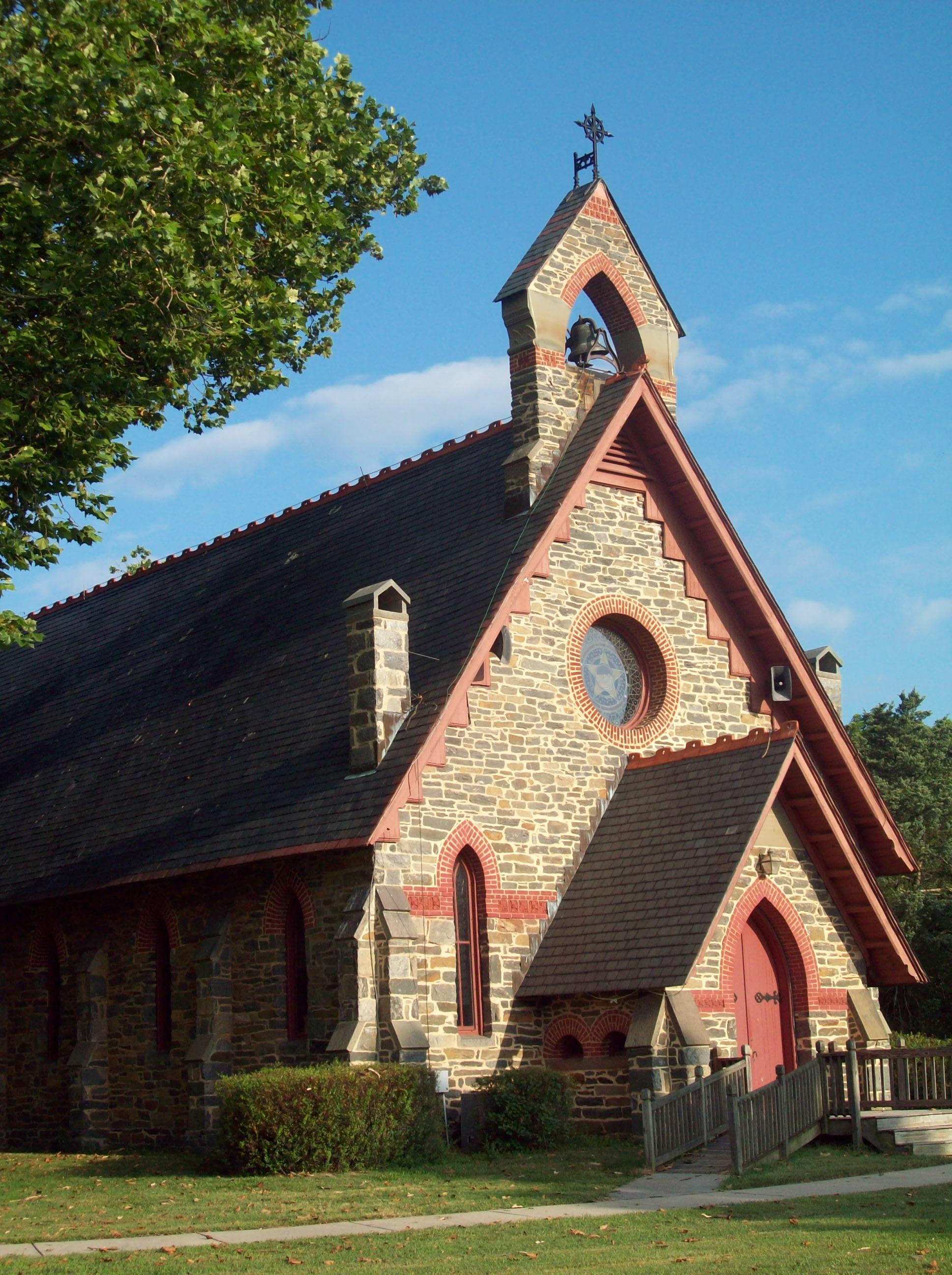
Charlotte Hall Historic District, Dent Memorial Chapel, July 2009
