= William P. Jackson =

American politician

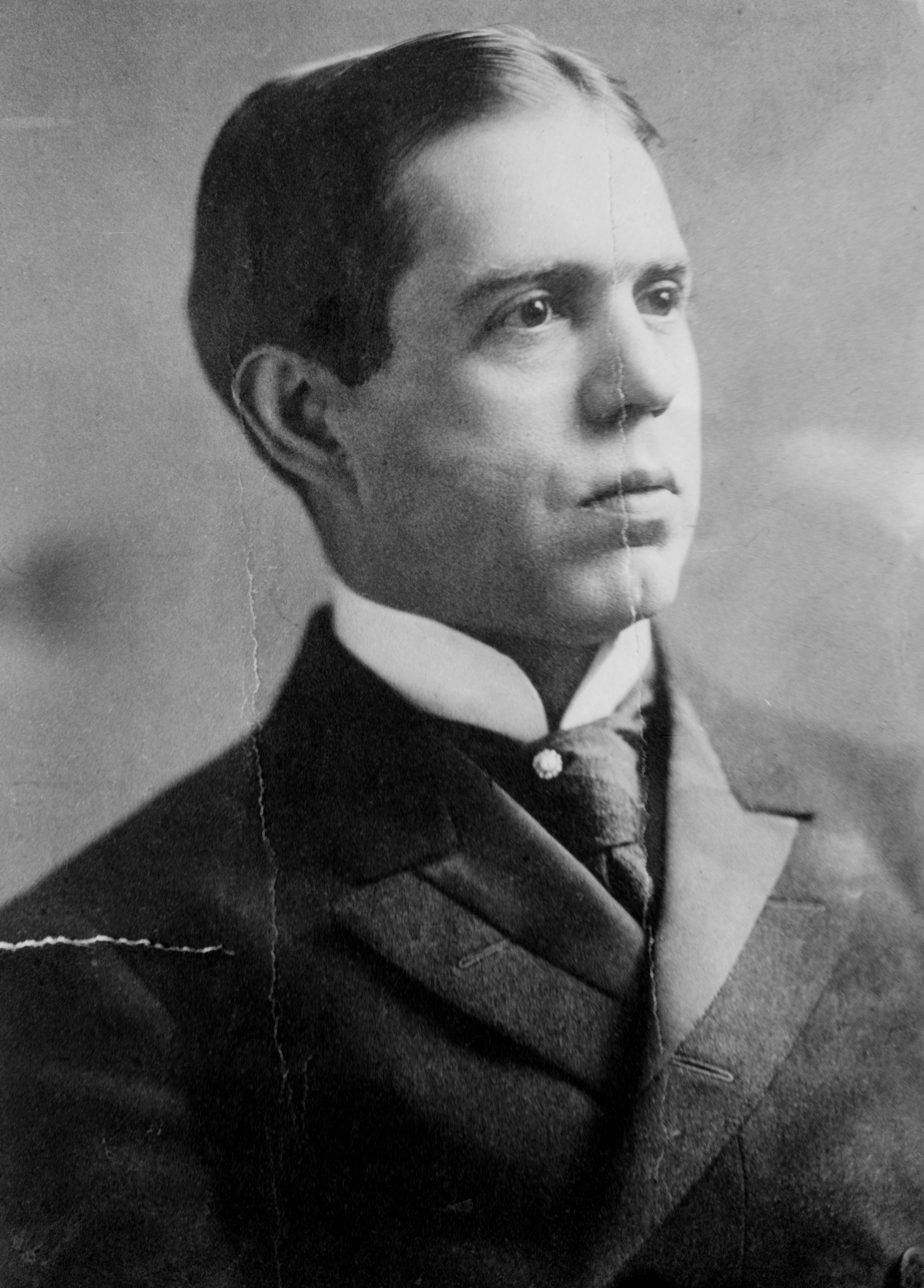

Treasurer of Maryland
- In office 1918–1920
- Governor: Emerson Harrington
- Preceded by: John M. Dennis
- Succeeded by: John M. Dennis

United States Senator from Maryland
- In office November 29, 1912 – January 28, 1914
- Appointed by: Phillips Lee Goldsborough
- Preceded by: Isidor Rayner
- Succeeded by: Blair Lee

Personal details
- Born: January 11, 1868 Salisbury, Maryland, U.S.
- Died: March 7, 1939 (aged 71) Salisbury, Maryland, U.S.
- Party: Republican

William Purnell Jackson (January 11, 1868 – March 7, 1939) was a Republican member of the United States Senate, representing the State of Maryland from 1912 to 1914. His father, William Humphreys Jackson, was a U.S. Congressman from Maryland.

== Biography ==
Jackson was born in Salisbury, Maryland, and attended the public schools of Wicomico County, Maryland and the Wilmington Conference Academy of Dover, Delaware. He engaged in the lumber business in 1887.

Jackson became a member of the Republican National Committee in 1908, and was appointed to the U.S. Senate to fill the vacancy caused by the death of Senator Isidor Rayner in 1912. While senator, Jackson served as chairman of the Committee on Expenditures in the Department of State (Sixty-second Congress).

A special election was called in 1913 to choose Rayner's successor, but Jackson chose not to become a candidate. He served from November 29, 1912, until January 28, 1914, when an elected successor, Blair Lee I, officially qualified for the position.

Following his short tenure in the Senate, Jackson resumed his former business pursuits in the lumber business. Jackson later served as Maryland State treasurer from 1918 to 1920; as president of the Salisbury National Bank; and a director of the Baltimore, Chesapeake & Atlantic Railway Company.

Jackson died in his hometown of Salisbury in 1939, and is buried at Parsons Cemetery. The home he built at Salisbury in 1893, the Sen. William P. Jackson House, was listed on the National Register of Historic Places in 1976, but demolished that same year.

U.S. Senate
Preceded by Isidor Rayner	U.S. senator (Class 1) from Maryland; 1912–1914; Served alongside: John Walter Smith	Succeeded by Blair Lee I
Political offices
Preceded by John M. Dennis	Treasurer of Maryland; 1918–1920	Succeeded by John M. Dennis
