= Sydney E. Mudd I =

American politician (1858–1911)

Sydney Emanuel Mudd I
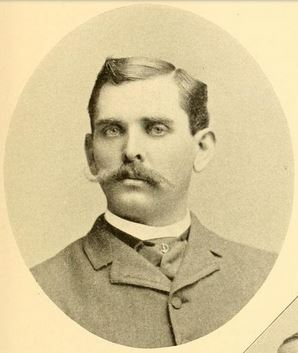

Member of the U.S. House of Representatives from Maryland's 5th district
- In office March 4, 1897 – March 3, 1911
- Preceded by: Barnes Compton
- Succeeded by: Thomas Parran Sr.

Speaker of the Maryland House of Delegates
- In office 1896

Member of the U.S. House of Representatives from Maryland's 5th district
- In office March 20, 1890 – March 3, 1891
- Preceded by: Charles Edward Coffin
- Succeeded by: Barnes Compton

Member of the Maryland House of Delegates
- In office 1879, 1881, 1896

Personal details
- Born: February 12, 1858 Charles County, Maryland
- Died: October 21, 1911 (aged 60) Philadelphia, Pennsylvania
- Resting place: St. Ignatius’ Catholic Church Cemetery
- Party: Republican
- Spouse: Ida Griffin (m. 1882; died 1907)
- Children: 4, including Sydney Emanuel Mudd II
- Relatives: Samuel Mudd (uncle)
- Education: St. John's College; University of Virginia
- Occupation: Politician

Sydney Emanuel Mudd I (February 12, 1858 – October 21, 1911) was a politician, elected as Speaker of the Maryland House of Delegates (1896) and as a Republican to the United States House of Representatives (1890–1891; 1897–1911), at a time of dominance by Democrats in much of the state. He was first seated by Congress in 1890 after it found in his favor in relation to the contested 1888 election in Maryland's 5th congressional district, which was marked by fraud and intimidation.

== Early life and education ==
Sydney Emanuel Mudd was born to Jeremiah T. Mudd on February 12, 1858. He was born into the planter class at the family plantation, Gallant Green, in Charles County, Maryland, Mudd was reared Catholic and first educated locally. He was the nephew of Samuel Mudd, the doctor who aided John Wilkes Booth after he assassinated President Abraham Lincoln.

He attended Georgetown University and graduated from St. John's College of Annapolis, Maryland in 1878. He "read the law" as an apprentice with an established firm and also attended the law department of the University of Virginia at Charlottesville. He was admitted to the bar in 1880 and returned to Charles County to begin his practice.

== Marriage and family ==
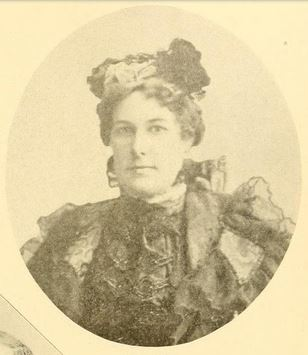
Ida Mudd (née Griffin)

Mudd married Ida Griffin, the daughter of Walter Griffin of Surrattsville (now part of Clinton, Maryland), in 1882. She died in 1907. Together, they had four children, one daughter and three sons. Among their children was Sydney Emanuel Mudd II, who became an attorney and politician like his father. The son was elected to several terms as a Congressman from Maryland's 5th district beginning in 1914, after his father's death.

== Career ==
Mudd was elected a member of the Maryland House of Delegates in 1879 and 1881.

As a Republican candidate, he challenged and successfully contested the 1888 election of Barnes Compton as US Representative from the 5th district to the Fifty-first Congress. At a time when many Maryland elections were surrounded by violence and fraud as Democrats sought to re-establish white supremacy, Mudd filed charges of election fraud. He claimed that election officials had turned away qualified voters and that, in Anne Arundel County, Democrats posing as US Marshals intimidated blacks, forcing them from the polls. The House Committee on Elections investigated and decided in his favor. Congress awarded the seat to Mudd in 1889, and he served in the next session, from March 20, 1890, to March 3, 1891. He was an unsuccessful candidate for reelection in 1890 to the Fifty-second Congress, defeated by Compton.

In 1895 Mudd was elected again to the state House of Delegates, where he served as Speaker of the House. He moved to rural La Plata, Maryland in 1896. He served as a delegate to the Republican National Convention the same year.

In 1896 Mudd benefitted by the coattails of a winning Republican biracial coalition that gained the governorship. He was elected from the 5th district to the Fifty-fifth and to the six succeeding Congresses, serving from March 4, 1897 to March 3, 1911. (His chief Democratic rival in the district, Barnes Compton, died in 1898.) In Congress, Mudd served as chairman of the Committee on Expenditures in the Department of Justice (Sixtieth and Sixty-first Congresses).

He was popularly known as "Marse Sydney" by his constituents.

== Death ==
Mudd died of a stroke in Philadelphia, Pennsylvania on October 21, 1911. He was interred in St. Ignatius’ Catholic Church Cemetery at Chapel Point near La Plata.

U.S. House of Representatives
| Preceded by Barnes Compton | Representative of the 5th Congressional District of Maryland; 1890–1891 | Succeeded by Barnes Compton |
| Preceded by Charles Edward Coffin | Representative of the 5th Congressional District of Maryland; 1897–1911 | Succeeded by Thomas Parran |
Political offices
| Preceded by James H. Preston | Speaker of the Maryland House of Delegates; 1896 | Succeeded by Louis Schaefer |
