= Dunkirk, Maryland =

- Census-designated place
- Location of Dunkirk, Maryland
- Coordinates: 38°42′49″N 76°40′12″W
- Country: United States
- State: Maryland
- County: Calvert

Area
  - Total: 7.34 sq mi (19.00 km^{2})
  - Land: 6.59 sq mi (17.06 km^{2})
  - Water: 0.75 sq mi (1.94 km^{2})
- Elevation: 121 ft (37 m)

Population (2020)
  - Total: 2,431
  - Density: 369.1/sq mi (142.52/km^{2})
- Time zone: UTC−5 (Eastern (EST))
  - Summer (DST): UTC−4 (EDT)
- ZIP code: 20754
- Area code: 410
- FIPS code: 24-24062
- GNIS feature ID: 1852590

Dunkirk is a census-designated place (CDP) in Calvert County, Maryland, United States. The population was 2,521 at the 2010 census.

It is the northernmost community in Calvert County and is the main commerce area for northern Calvert County.

A small portion of Dunkirk is part of Anne Arundel County, MD.

== Geography ==
Dunkirk is located in northwestern Calvert County at 38°42′49″N 76°40′12″W (38.713499, −76.670070). Its western border is the Patuxent River, which is also the Prince George's County line. Maryland Route 4 passes through the center of Dunkirk, leading northwest 10 miles (16 km) to Upper Marlboro and south 14 miles (23 km) to Prince Frederick, the Calvert County seat. Downtown Washington, D.C., is 25 miles (40 km) to the northwest.

According to the United States Census Bureau, the Dunkirk CDP has a total area of 7.3 square miles (19.0 km^{2}), of which 6.6 square miles (17.1 km^{2}) is land and 0.73 square miles (1.9 km^{2}), or 10.21%, is water.

=== Climate ===
The climate in this area is characterized by hot, humid summers and generally mild to cool winters. According to the Köppen Climate Classification system, Dunkirk has a humid subtropical climate, abbreviated "Cfa" on climate maps.

== Demographics ==
Historical population
Census	Pop.	Note	%±
2020	2,431		—
U.S. Decennial Census

=== 2020 census ===
As of the 2020 census, Dunkirk had a population of 2,431. The median age was 45.4 years. 21.4% of residents were under the age of 18 and 18.6% of residents were 65 years of age or older. For every 100 females there were 109.2 males, and for every 100 females age 18 and over there were 104.3 males age 18 and over.

0.0% of residents lived in urban areas, while 100.0% lived in rural areas.

There were 835 households in Dunkirk, of which 32.0% had children under the age of 18 living in them. Of all households, 73.4% were married-couple households, 9.7% were households with a male householder and no spouse or partner present, and 12.0% were households with a female householder and no spouse or partner present. About 10.6% of all households were made up of individuals and 7.3% had someone living alone who was 65 years of age or older.

There were 866 housing units, of which 3.6% were vacant. The homeowner vacancy rate was 1.2% and the rental vacancy rate was 16.7%.

Racial composition as of the 2020 census
Race	Number	Percent
White	2,049	84.3%
Black or African American	147	6.0%
American Indian and Alaska Native	2	0.1%
Asian	47	1.9%
Native Hawaiian and Other Pacific Islander	0	0.0%
Some other race	30	1.2%
Two or more races	156	6.4%
Hispanic or Latino (of any race)	125	5.1%

=== 2000 census ===
As of the census of 2000, there were 2,363 people, 757 households, and 681 families residing in the CDP. The population density was 348.7 inhabitants per square mile (134.6/km^{2}). There were 773 housing units at an average density of 114.1 per square mile (44.1/km^{2}). The racial makeup of the CDP was 91.62% White, 5.97% African American, 0.08% Native American, 1.02% Asian, 0.25% from other races, and 1.06% from two or more races. Hispanic or Latino of any race were 0.85% of the population.

There were 757 households, out of which 40.7% had children under the age of 18 living with them, 80.2% were married couples living together, 7.4% had a female householder with no husband present, and 10.0% were non-families. 7.9% of all households were made up of individuals, and 2.4% had someone living alone who was 65 years of age or older. The average household size was 3.12 and the average family size was 3.28.

In the CDP, the population was spread out, with 29.1% under the age of 18, 5.9% from 18 to 24, 25.8% from 25 to 44, 31.3% from 45 to 64, and 7.9% who were 65 years of age or older. The median age was 39 years. For every 100 females, there were 100.6 males. For every 100 females age 18 and over, there were 97.1 males.

The median income for a household in the CDP was $107,508, and the median income for a family was $102,240. Males had a median income of $157,900 versus $61,025 for females. The per capita income for the CDP was $31,923. None of the families and 0.2% of the population were living below the poverty line, including no under eighteens and none of those over 64.
