= Charlotte Hall, Maryland =

- CDP
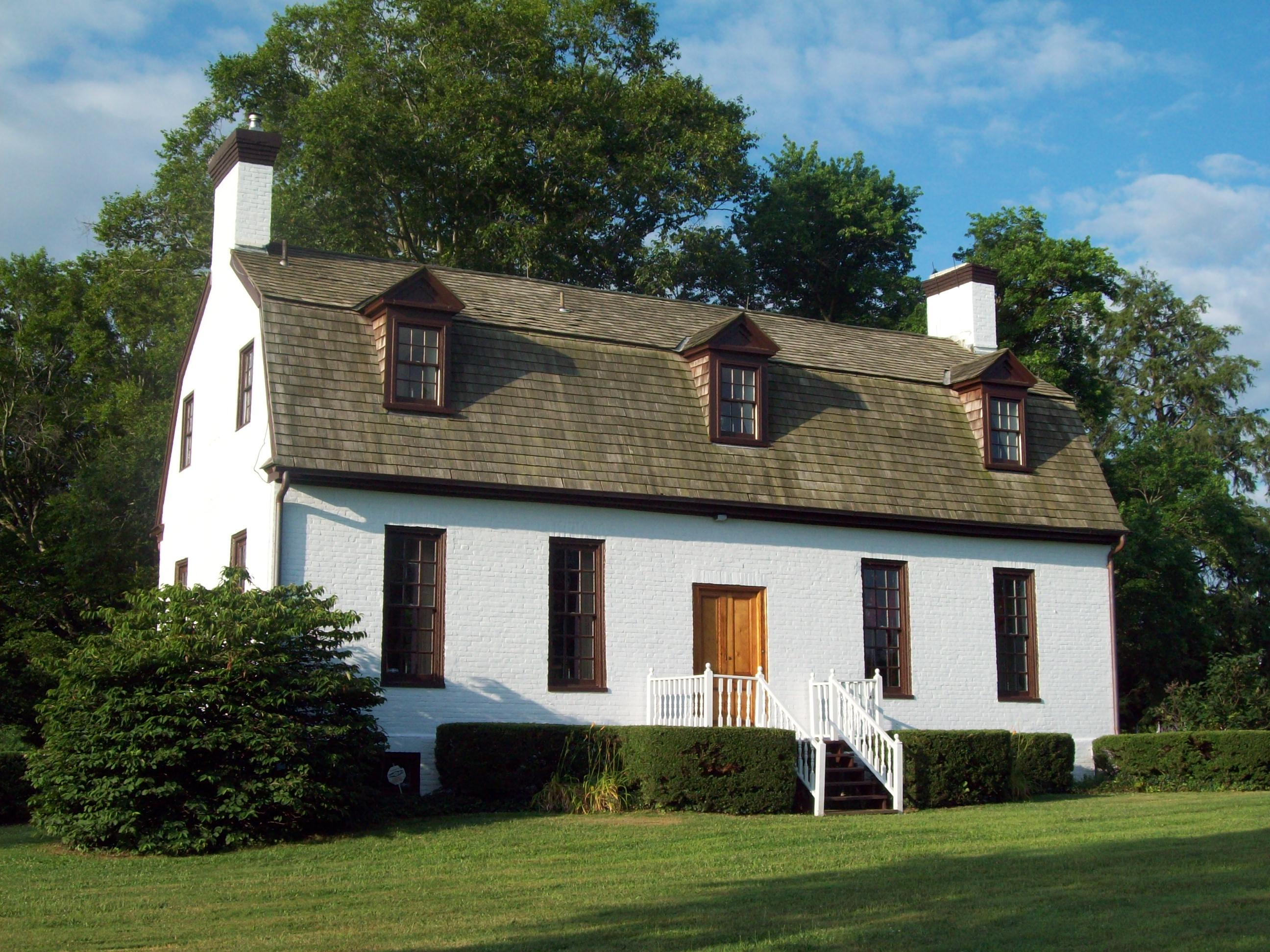
- White Hall in Charlotte Hall Historic District

- Location of Charlotte Hall in St. Mary's County, Maryland
- Coordinates: 38°28′38″N 76°46′35″W
- Country: United States
- State: Maryland
- Counties: Charles, St. Mary's

Area
  - Total: 5.07 sq mi (13.13 km^{2})
  - Land: 5.06 sq mi (13.11 km^{2})
  - Water: 0.0077 sq mi (0.02 km^{2})
- Elevation: 160 ft (50 m)

Population (2020)
  - Total: 1,388
  - Density: 274.2/sq mi (105.86/km^{2})
- Time zone: UTC−5 (Eastern (EST))
  - Summer (DST): UTC−4 (EDT)
- FIPS code: 24-15475
- GNIS feature ID: 0594648

Charlotte Hall is a census-designated place (CDP) in Charles and St. Mary's counties, Maryland, United States. The population was 1,420 at the 2010 census. The Maryland Veterans Home for disabled veterans, is located on the site of the former Charlotte Hall Military Academy. The Academy site was declared the Charlotte Hall Historic District, and listed on the National Register of Historic Places in 1975. Since 1940, a sizable Amish farming community has existed nearby, along with numerous strip mall businesses along Maryland Route 5 continuing into the adjacent community of Mechanicsville. A former large sprawling flea market complex was demolished in 2024. A U.S. Veterans Affairs clinic is across the highway from the Veterans Home.

== Geography ==
Charlotte Hall is located at 38°28′38″N 76°46′35″W (38.477210, −76.776323).

According to the United States Census Bureau, the CDP has a total area of 5.1 square miles (13 km^{2}), all land.

== Demographics ==
Historical population
| Census | Pop. | Note | %± |
|---|---|---|---|
| 2020 | 1,388 | | — |
U.S. Decennial Census

As of the census of 2000, there were 1,214 people, 317 households, and 239 families residing in the CDP. The population density was 237.8 inhabitants per square mile (91.8/km^{2}). There were 332 housing units at an average density of 65.0 per square mile (25.1/km^{2}). The racial makeup of the CDP was 76.03% White, 20.18% African American, 0.91% Native American, 0.08% Asian, 0.08% Pacific Islander, and 2.72% from two or more races. Hispanic or Latino of any race were 0.58% of the population.

There were 317 households, out of which 30.9% had children under the age of 18 living with them, 55.8% were married couples living together, 15.1% had a female householder with no husband present, and 24.3% were non-families. 15.8% of all households were made up of individuals, and 6.9% had someone living alone who was 65 years of age or older. The average household size was 2.82 and the average family size was 3.15.

In the CDP, the population was spread out, with 18.1% under the age of 18, 5.5% from 18 to 24, 21.1% from 25 to 44, 22.1% from 45 to 64, and 33.2% who were 65 years of age or older. The median age was 50 years. For every 100 females, there were 150.8 males. For every 100 females age 18 and over, there were 170.1 males.

The median income for a household in the CDP was $51,111, and the median income for a family was $49,167. Males had a median income of $33,056 versus $21,071 for females. The per capita income for the CDP was $17,882. About 14.5% of families and 19.2% of the population were below the poverty line, including 33.0% of those under age 18 and 5.6% of those age 65 or over.

== Notable people ==
- William Saunders Crowdy, the African-American theologian, was born as a slave here in 1847
