= List of Maryland state historical markers in Charles County =

This is a list of the Maryland state historical markers in Charles County.

This is intended to be a complete list of the official state historical markers placed in Charles County, Maryland by the Maryland Historical Trust (MHT). The locations of the historical markers, as well as the latitude and longitude coordinates as provided by the MHT's database, are included below. There are currently 49 historical markers located in Charles County.

Marker title	Image	City	Location	Topics
300-Year Old Southern Red Oak		Newburg, Maryland	MD 257 (north side), 400 ft east of US 301; 38°22′45.14″N 76°57′19.26″W	
Araby	Araby	Mason Springs, Maryland	MD 255 (west side), 0.3 miles southeast of MD 224; 38°34′47.96″N 77°06′54.28″W	
Benedict		Benedict, Maryland	MD 231 (south side) at Benedict Avenue; 38°30′57.10″N 76°40′51.70″W	
Boarman's Manor		Bryantown, Maryland	Oliver Shop Road (east side) at Notre Dame Place; 38°32′20.92″N 76°50′30.32″W	
Brentland		McConchle, Maryland	MD 6 at Blossom Point Road; 38°29′26.18″N 77°04′05.14″W	
Budds Ferry		Doncaster, Maryland	MD 224 (west side) at Budd's Ferry Place; 38°30′43.77″N 77°14′44.40″W	
Camp Stanton		Benedict, Maryland	MD 231 (south side) at Benedict Avenue; 38°30′57.12″N 76°40′51.03″W	
Cedar Point		Morgantown, Maryland	13050 Rock Point Road, north of Morgantown Road; 38°21′14.20″N 76°56′19.60″W	
Chandlers Hope		La Plata, Maryland	US 301 (west side) at Old Stagecoach Road; 38°30′16.15″N 76°59′08.05″W	
Christ Church Episcopal		La Plata, Maryland	MD 6 (north side), at Church Street, west side 38°31′46.31″N 76°58′46.02″W	
Christ Church William and Mary Parish 1690		Newburg, Maryland	MD 257 (east side), 500 ft. north of Morgantown Road; 38°21′13.24″N 76°56′20.50″W	
Church of St. Joseph		Pomfret, Maryland	MD 227 (north side) at St. Joseph's Lane; 38°35′06.57″N 77°01′28.44″W	
Cliffton		Newburg, Maryland	US 301 (east side) at Cliffton Drive; 38°22′17.70″N 76°57′36.78″W	
Courthouse at Moore's Lodge		La Plata, Maryland	US 301 at Springhill-Newtown Rd. 38°30′17.43″N 76°59′04.15″W	
Dents Meadow		Faulkner, Maryland	Popes Creek Road (west side), 1.3 miles south of US 301; 38°25′03.94″N 76°59′11.27″W	
Dr. James Craik		La Plata, Maryland	MD 6 (south side), 50 ft. east of Walnut Hill Road; 38°31′29.93″N 76°59′29.64″W	
Dr. Mudd's House	St. Catharine	St. Charles, Maryland	MD 5 at St. Charles Parkway, southeast corner 38°36′51.92″N 76°52′53.50″W	
Efton Hills		Nanjemoy, Maryland	MD 6 (east side), 0.2 miles south of MD 425; 38°26′14.62″N 77°11′58.57″W	
Eutaw		Pomfret, Maryland	Captain Dement Drive (end), 0.5 miles west of MD 229; 38°37′31.97″N 77°01′28.02″W	
General Daniel E. Sickles, USA	Daniel Edgar Sickes	Doncaster, Maryland	MD 6 (west side), at Clements Place, 0.7 miles south of MD 344; 38°29′45.13″N 77°13′22.13″W	
General Joseph Hooker USA		Chicamuxen, Maryland	MD 224 (north side), 1 mile east of MD 344; 38°32′03.33″N 77°13′16.68″W	
Home of Dr. Samuel Mudd	St. Catharine	St. Charles, Maryland	Dr. Samuel Mudd Road (west side), 0.4 miles south of Poplar Hill Road; 38°36′33.35″N 76°49′26.90″W	
Huckleberry		Faulkner, Maryland	Popes Creek Road (west side) at Loyola Retreat Road; 38°25′32.13″N 76°59′04.80″W	
Indian Head		Indian Head, Maryland	MD 210, 100 ft. west of Poplar Lane, in median 38°36′04.95″N 77°08′49.71″W	
John Wilkes Booth	John Wilkes Booth	Bel Alton, Maryland	Bel Alton Road at Fairgrounds Road, in grassy triangle 38°27′43.81″N 76°59′15.55″W	
John Wilkes Booth and David Herold	John Wilkes Booth David Herold	Bel Alton, Maryland	Bel Alton Road at Wills Road, SE corner, by railroad tracks 38°27′46.83″N 76°59′08.92″W	
Keechland		Newburg, Maryland	Popes Creek Road (east side) at Keechland Drive; 38°24′19.09″N 76°59′31.77″W	
La Plata Elementary School		La Plata, Maryland	Willow Lane (north west side) at Milton M. Somers Middle School; 38°31′27.98″N 76°58′09.70″W	
Laidler's Ferry		Newburg, Maryland	US 301 (north) south of Cliffton Drive; 38°22′05″N 76°58′23″W	
Marshall Hall	Marshall Hall	Marshall Hall, Maryland	MD 227 (east side), 1.4 miles northwest of Barrys Hill Road; 38°40′55.12″N 77°05′47.46″W	
Mattawoman Run		Waldorf, Maryland	US 301(west side), 0.15 mile south of Mattowoman Run; 38°39′23″N 76°52′35.4″W	
Maxwell Hall		Hughesville, Maryland	US 231, 100 ft east of Teague's Point Road; 38°31′55.71″N 76°44′08.46″W	
Milestone in Radio History		Cobb Island, Maryland	MD 254 (Cobb Island Road) at Potomac River Drive; 38°15′38.34″N 76°51′06.02″W	
Mulberry Grove		Port Tobacco, Maryland	Chapel Point Road at Mulberry Grove; 38°29′25.02″N 77°01′00.76″W	
Myrtle Grove Game Refuge		Mason Springs, Maryland	MD 225 (north side) at Myrtle Grove Road; 38°32′57.04″N 77°05′02.88″W	
Port Tobacco	Port Tobacco	Port Tobacco, Maryland	MD 6 (south side), 100 ft. east of Chapel Point Road; 38°30′59.06″N 77°01′01.55″W	
Port Tobacco	Port Tobacco	Port Tobacco, Maryland	Port Tobacco Square at end of Commerce Street; 38°30′40.08″N 77°01′12.99″W	
Rich Hill	Rich Hall	Bel Alton, Maryland	Bel Alton-Newton Road (north side) at Rich Farm Road; 38°28′13.07″N 76°57′59.51″W	
Rose Hill/Dr. Gustavus Richard Brown		Port Tobacco, Maryland	Rose Hill Road (west side) at Betty's Delight Place; 38°31′18.80″N 77°01′43.40″W	
Rose Hill/Miss Olivia Floyd		Port Tobacco, Maryland	Rose Hill Road (west side) at Betty's Delight Place; 38°31′18.93″N 77°01′43.46″W	
Rum Point		Marbury, Maryland	MD 224 (west side) at Stumpneck Road; 38°32′12.79″N 77°11′49.35″W	
Smallwood's Home	Smallwood House	Rison, Maryland	MD 224 at Sweden Point Road; 38°33′13.70″N 77°10′29.22″W	
St. Ignatius Catholic Church St. Thomas Manor		Bel Alton, Maryland	Chapel Point Road (south side), 1.8 miles west of US 301; 38°27′56.13″N 77°01′26.56″W	
St. Mary's Church	St. Mary's Catholic Church	Bryantown, Maryland	Oliver Shop Road (east side) at Notre Dame Place; 38°32′18.92″N 76°50′29.59″W	
The Monastery		La Plata, Maryland	Mitchell Road (east side) at Mount Carmel Road; 38°33′23.24″N 77°00′22.20″W	
The Retreat	The Retreat	Port Tobacco, Maryland	MD 6 at Poor House Road; 38°30′29″N 77°02′40″W	
Thomas Stone	alt = Thomas Stone	La Plata, Maryland	MD 255 at Rose Hill Road, southeast corner 38°32′57.30″N 77°02′22.91″W	
Washington's Farm		Nanjemoy, Maryland	Liverpool Point Road at Beaverdam Road, southwest corner 38°27′16.92″N 77°13′02.92″W	
Wolleston Manor		Newburg, Maryland	US 301 at MD 257 (Edge Hill/ Rock Point Roads), in median 38°22′47.18″N 76°57′25.97″W	

== See also ==
- National Register of Historic Places listings in Charles County, Maryland
