= List of former Maryland state highways (500–599) =

Highway names
- Interstates: Interstate X (I-X)
- US Highways: U.S. Route X (US X)
- State: Maryland Route X (MD X)
- Former state highways: 2–199; 200–399; 400–499; 500–599; 600–699; 700–999

System links
- Maryland highway system; Interstate; US; State; Scenic Byways

The Maryland highway system has several hundred former state highways. These highways were constructed, maintained, or funded by the Maryland State Roads Commission or Maryland State Highway Administration and assigned a unique or temporally unique number. Some time after the highway was assigned, the highway was transferred to county or municipal maintenance and the number designation was removed from the particular stretch of road. In some cases, a highway was renumbered in whole or in part. This list contains all or most of the state-numbered highways between 500 and 599 that have existed since highways were first numbered in 1927 but are no longer part of the state highway system or are state highways of a different number. Most former state highways have not had their numbers reused. However, many state highway numbers were used for a former highway and are currently in use. Some numbers have been used three times. The former highways below whose numbers are used presently, those that were taken over in whole or in part by another highway, or have enough information to warrant a separate article contain links to those separate highway articles. Highway numbers that have two or more former uses are differentiated below by year ranges. This list does not include former Interstate or U.S. Highways, which are linked from their respective lists.

== MD 502 ==
Maryland Route 502
- Location: Stockton
- Existed: c. 1946–1961

Maryland Route 502 was the designation for Greenbackville Road, which ran from the Virginia state line at Greenbackville north to MD 366 near Stockton in southeastern Worcester County. The state highway was assigned by 1946. MD 502 was removed from the state highway system in 1960.

== MD 503 ==
Maryland Route 503
- Location: Lusby
- Existed: 1933–1957

Maryland Route 503 was the designation for Olivet Road from the community of Olivet at the confluence of Mill Creek and St. John Creek north to MD 2 (now MD 765) near Lusby in southern Calvert County. The highway was constructed as a gravel road in 1933. MD 503 was removed from the state highway system in 1957. Part of the course of MD 503 was returned to the state highway system in 1963 and is now part of MD 760.

== MD 504 ==
Maryland Route 504
- Location: Solomons
- Existed: 1933–1957

Maryland Route 504 was the designation for Dowell Road from near the confluence of Back Creek and St. John Creek north to MD 2 (now MD 765) near Solomons in southern Calvert County. The highway was constructed as a gravel road in 1933. MD 504 was resurfaced in 1944 due to being the access road to a U.S. Navy amphibious base. The highway was removed from the state highway system in 1957.

== MD 505 ==
Maryland Route 505
- Location: Lusby
- Existed: 1933–1957

Maryland Route 505 was the designation for Coster Road from near the confluence of Hellen Creek and the Patuxent River east to MD 2 (now MD 765) near Lusby in southern Calvert County. The highway was constructed as a gravel road in 1933. MD 505 was removed from the state highway system in 1957.

== MD 507 ==
Maryland Route 507
- Location: Prince Frederick
- Existed: 1933–1957

Maryland Route 507 was the designation for Stoakley Road from the intersection of Barstow Road and Leitches Wharf Road east to MD 2 near Prince Frederick in central Calvert County. The highway was constructed as a gravel road in 1933. MD 507 was removed from the state highway system in 1957.

== MD 510 ==
Maryland Route 510
- Location: Sunderland
- Existed: 1933–1957

Maryland Route 510 was the designation for Huntingtown Road from Mill Branch Road north to MD 262 near Sunderland in northern Calvert County. The highway was constructed as a gravel road in 1933. MD 510 was removed from the state highway system in 1957.

== MD 511 ==
Maryland Route 511
- Location: Mutual
- Existed: 1933–1957

Maryland Route 511 was the designation for Parkers Wharf Road from near the Patuxent River north to MD 264 near Mutual in southern Calvert County. The highway was constructed as a gravel road in 1933. MD 511 was removed from the state highway system in 1957.

== MD 512 ==
Maryland Route 512
- Location: Mutual
- Existed: 1933–1957

Maryland Route 512 was the designation for Williams Wharf Road from near the Patuxent River east to MD 264 near Mutual in southern Calvert County. The highway was constructed as a gravel road in 1933. MD 512 was removed from the state highway system in 1957.

== MD 513 ==
Maryland Route 513
- Location: Takoma Park
- Existed: 1932–1955

Maryland Route 513 was the designation for Piney Branch Road from the Washington, D.C., boundary in Takoma Park north to MD 320 in Silver Spring in southeastern Montgomery County. The highway, which was also named Saratoga Avenue in Takoma Park, was constructed in 1931 and 1932. MD 513 was replaced by a southern extension of MD 320 in 1955; MD 320 was removed from its original course along Sligo Avenue, which became MD 339.

== MD 515 ==
Maryland Route 515
- Location: Silver Spring
- Existed: 1934–1960

Maryland Route 515 was the designation for Second Avenue from MD 384 north to MD 391 within Silver Spring in southeastern Montgomery County. The highway was completed as a macadam road in 1933 and 1934. MD 515 was removed from the state highway system in 1960.

== MD 516 ==
Maryland Route 516
- Location: Silver Spring
- Length: 0.90 mi (1,450 m)
- Existed: 1933–1999

Maryland Route 516 was the designation for Franklin Avenue from US 29 east to MD 193 within Silver Spring in southeastern Montgomery County. The highway was constructed as a macadam road between 1931 and 1933. MD 516, which had a length of 0.90 miles (1.45 km), was transferred to county maintenance in 1999 as part of the highway swap to designate the Great Seneca Highway as MD 119.

== MD 517 ==
Maryland Route 517
- Location: Norrisville–Pylesville
- Existed: 1933–1956

Maryland Route 517 was the designation for Harkins Road from MD 23 in Norrisville east to MD 24 near Pylesville in northern Harford County. The highway was constructed as a concrete road from MD 24 west to the hamlet of Harkins at Fawn Grove Road in 1933. MD 517 was extended west as a macadam road from Harkins to the hamlet of Carea at Carea Road in 1934 and 1935. The highway was completed to Norrisville in 1936. MD 517 was replaced by a westward extension of MD 136 in 1956.

== MD 519 ==
Maryland Route 519
- Location: Reisterstown
- Existed: 1933–1979

Maryland Route 519 was the designation for the portion of Greenspring Avenue from Worthington Road east to Dover Road east of Reisterstown in central Baltimore County. The highway was paved from Worthington Road to Baublitz Road by 1933 and extended to Dover Road in 1935. MD 519 was removed from the state highway system in 1979.

== MD 523 ==
Maryland Route 523
- Location: Chaneyville
- Existed: 1932–1957

Maryland Route 523 was the designation for Chaneyville Road from a point near the Patuxent River east to MD 416 (now MD 4) at Chaneyville in northern Calvert County. The highway was constructed as a gravel road in 1932. MD 523 was removed from the state highway system in 1957.

== MD 524 ==
Maryland Route 524
- Location: Owings
- Existed: 1932–1957

Maryland Route 524 was the designation for Grovers Turn Road from Mount Harmony Road—which until 1955 had been part of MD 260—east to MD 2 (now MD 778) near Owings in northern Calvert County. The highway was constructed as a gravel road in 1932. MD 524 was removed from the state highway system in 1957.

== MD 525 ==
Maryland Route 525
- Location: Dunkirk
- Existed: 1932–1957

Maryland Route 525 was the designation for Ferry Landing Road from a point near the Patuxent River east to MD 416 (now MD 4) at Dunkirk in northern Calvert County. The highway was constructed as a gravel road in 1932. MD 525 was removed from the state highway system in 1957.

== MD 526 ==
Maryland Route 526
- Location: Westminster
- Existed: 1954–c. 1999

Maryland Route 526 was the designation for Pennsylvania Avenue from Main Street (then MD 32) north to MD 97 and MD 140 within Westminster in central Carroll County. The highway was originally part of US 140 (now MD 97 north of MD 140). MD 526 was assigned to Pennsylvania Avenue after US 140 was moved to the Westminster Bypass when it opened in 1954. The highway was removed from the state highway system between 1985 and 1999.

== MD 530 ==
Maryland Route 530
- Location: Chestertown
- Length: 0.14 mi (230 m)
- Existed: c. 1939–1960

Maryland Route 530 was the designation for the 0.14-mile-long (0.23 km) section of Cross Street between High Street and US 213 in Chestertown in central Kent County. These two blocks of Cross Street were brought into the state highway system by 1939. MD 530 was transferred from state to municipal maintenance after the street was paved in bituminous concrete by the terms of a March 2, 1960, road transfer agreement. Cross Street re-entered the state highway system through an August 28, 1985, road transfer agreement and is now part of MD 289.

== MD 531 (1933–1946) ==
Maryland Route 531
- Location: Jessup–Ellicott City
- Existed: 1933–c. 1946

Maryland Route 531 was the designation for Waterloo Road from US 1 in Jessup north to MD 103 near Ellicott City in eastern Howard County. The highway was constructed as a macadam road in 1932. MD 531 was replaced by an extension of MD 175 northwest from Jessup by 1946. The highway's path is now followed mostly by MD 108 and MD 104, which replaced MD 175 north from modern MD 175 around 1977.

== MD 531 (1946–1959) ==
Maryland Route 531
- Location: Galestown–Reliance
- Existed: c. 1946–1959

Maryland Route 531 was the designation for Galestown–Reliance Road, which ran from Galestown Newhart Mill Road in Galestown north to MD 392 at Reliance in northeastern Dorchester County. For much of its course south from Reliance, the highway followed the Maryland–Delaware state line. MD 531 was established by 1946. The highway was removed from the state highway system in 1959.

== MD 532 ==
Maryland Route 532
- Location: Mount Airy, Lisbon
- Existed: 1933–1956

Maryland Route 532 was the designation for a pair of highways, one each in southwestern Carroll County and northwestern Howard County. The Carroll County portion of the highway followed West Watersville Road from MD 27 (now MD 808) in Mount Airy east to Watersville Road in southwestern Carroll County. The Howard County portion of MD 532 followed East Watersville Road from a point north of US 40 near Lisbon north part of the way to the Patapsco River in western Howard County. The first portion of the Carroll County segment was built as a concrete road east from Mount Airy in 1933. MD 532 was completed as a macadam road east to Watersville Road in 1935. The Howard County segment was built in 1934 and 1935. Both counties' segments of MD 532 were removed from the state highway system in 1956.

== MD 533 ==
Maryland Route 533
- Location: Cobb Island
- Existed: 1932–1958

Maryland Route 533 was the designation for Cobb Island Road from Cobb Island north to MD 3 (now MD 257) near Rock Point in southern Charles County. The highway was constructed in 1932. MD 533 was renumbered MD 254 in 1958.

== MD 534 ==
Maryland Route 534
- Location: Forestville–Largo
- Existed: c. 1933–1955

Maryland Route 534 was the designation for Forestville Road and Ritchie Road from MD 4 (now Marlboro Pike) in Forestville north to MD 221 near Largo in central Prince George's County. The highway was constructed as a gravel road along with Ritchie Road north of Ritchie–Marlboro Road north to MD 214 in 1923. Ritchie–Marlboro Road east from Ritchie Road to Upper Marlboro was completed in 1933. By 1939, the southern portion of Ritchie Road and Forestville Road to the south were designated MD 534. MD 534 and MD 221 were removed from the state highway system in 1955.

== MD 536 ==
Maryland Route 536
- Location: Welcome
- Existed: 1933–1956

Maryland Route 536 was the designation for Blossom Point Road, which ran from MD 6 south to a point south of Mill Swamp Road near Welcome in western Charles County. The highway was constructed as a gravel road in 1933. MD 536 was removed from the state highway system in 1956.

== MD 537 ==
Maryland Route 537
- Location: Galena
- Length: 0.71 mi (1,140 m)
- Existed: 1951–1987

Maryland Route 537 was the designation for Daves Hill Road, which ran 0.71 miles (1.14 km) between intersections with MD 213 on either side of Woodland Creek west of Galena in northeastern Kent County. The highway was part of the original Chestertown–Galena state road and was constructed as a 12-foot-wide (3.7 m) macadam road in 1913. The state road became part of US 213 in 1927 and was widened to 15 feet (4.6 m) by 1934. MD 537 was assigned to Daves Hill Road after US 213 was reconstructed and relocated west of Galena in 1950 and 1951. The highway was transferred from state to county maintenance through a December 1, 1987, road transfer agreement.

== MD 539 ==
Maryland Route 539
- Location: Columbia
- Existed: 1956–1959

Maryland Route 539 was the designation for Old Annapolis Road from US 29 in the then-hamlet of Columbia at the modern junction of US 29 and MD 108 east to MD 175 at the hamlet of Jonestown at what is now the junction of MD 108 and MD 104 in eastern Howard County. The existing county highway was brought into the state system in 1956. MD 539 was replaced by an eastward extension of MD 108 in 1960 when MD 108 was extended east along what had been US 29 from Ashton to Columbia.

== MD 541 ==
Maryland Route 541
- Location: Tyaskin
- Existed: 1933–1956

Maryland Route 541 was the designation for Tyaskin Road from MD 349 north to Tyaskin in western Wicomico County. The highway was built as a macadam road in 1933. MD 541 was removed from the state highway system in 1956.

== MD 548 ==
Maryland Route 548
- Location: Allen
- Existed: 1933–1956

Maryland Route 548 was the designation for Upper Ferry Road from MD 529 (now Allen Road) at Allen north to the south port of the Upper Ferry on the Wicomico River in southern Wicomico County. The first segment of the highway was built as a macadam road a short distance north from Allen in 1933. MD 548 was extended north as a macadam road to Upper Ferry in 1935. The highway was removed from the state highway system in 1956.

== MD 549 ==
Maryland Route 549
- Location: Fort Washington
- Existed: 1933–1955

Maryland Route 549 was the designation for Fort Washington Road from Fort Washington Park north to MD 224 (now Livingston Road) in Fort Washington. The highway was constructed as a gravel road in 1933. MD 549 was removed from the state highway system in 1955.

== MD 551 ==
Maryland Route 551
- Location: Cambridge
- Existed: c. 1946–1956

Maryland Route 551 was the designation for Washington Street from MD 343 east to MD 16 within Cambridge in central Dorchester County. MD 343 then entered Cambridge along its current path but turned north onto High Street to pass through downtown Cambridge. MD 16 then entered Cambridge along Race Street (now MD 341) and turned east onto Washington Street. MD 551 was established by 1946. When MD 343 was removed from downtown Cambridge in 1956, it was rerouted to a new eastern terminus at MD 16 at the intersection of Washington and Race streets, thus replacing MD 551.

== MD 554 ==
Maryland Route 554
- Location: Severn
- Existed: 1933–1983

Maryland Route 554 was the designation for a pair of highways in Severn in western Anne Arundel County. The designation was originally assigned to Telegraph Road from Odenton north to the MD 170–MD 174 intersection in Severn. At that time, MD 170 turned west at Severn to head toward Fort George G. Meade. The Odenton–Severn highway's first section was constructed south from Severn in 1932 and 1933 and completed shortly after 1940. MD 554 and MD 170 swapped numbers by 1946; MD 170 headed south from Severn toward Odenton, and MD 554 headed west from Severn toward Fort Meade along Reece Road. In 1983, MD 554 was replaced by a westward extension of MD 174.

== MD 555 ==
Maryland Route 555
- Location: Plum Point
- Existed: 1933–1957

Maryland Route 555 was the designation for Wilson Road from MD 263 at Plum Point south a short distance in central Calvert County. The highway was constructed as a gravel road in 1933. MD 555 was removed from the state highway system in 1957.

== MD 556 ==
Maryland Route 556
- Location: Woodmore
- Existed: 1933–1989

Maryland Route 556 was the designation for Enterprise Road from MD 202 north to MD 450 near Woodmore in central Prince George's County. The first segment of the highway was built as a concrete road from MD 214 north to near the hamlet of Woodmore in 1933. A disjoint segment of MD 556 was constructed from US 50 (now MD 450) south to Glenn Dale Road by 1939. By 1946, the gap was closed and the highway extended from MD 214 to US 50. MD 556 was extended south to MD 202 in 1955. When the new Glenn Dale Boulevard was completed in 1985, MD 193 was removed from Glenn Dale Road and placed on the new highway south to MD 450 and replaced MD 556 south to MD 214. MD 193 was extended south over the remaining segment of MD 556 between MD 214 and MD 202 in 1989.

== MD 558 ==
Maryland Route 558
- Location: Bel Alton
- Existed: 1933–1956

Maryland Route 558 was the designation for Bel Alton Newtown Road from MD 3 (now Fairgrounds Road) northeast to MD 6 at the hamlet of Newtown southeast of La Plata in southern Charles County. The first segment of the highway, from MD 3 to near Clark Run, was completed as a gravel road in 1933. MD 558 was completed to MD 6 in 1936. The highway was removed from the state highway system in 1956.

== MD 559 ==
Maryland Route 559
- Location: Westminster
- Existed: 1934–1956

Maryland Route 559 was the designation for Gorsuch Road from the Westminster city limit east to the hamlet of Tannery on the Western Maryland Railway in central Carroll County. The first half of the highway was constructed as a concrete road from the Westminster end in 1934. MD 559 was extended to Tannery by 1946. The highway was removed from the state highway system in 1956.

== MD 563 ==
Maryland Route 563
- Location: Riverside–Chicamuxen
- Existed: 1934–1956

Maryland Route 563 was the designation for Riverside Road, which ran from MD 6 at Riverside north to MD 224 near Chicamuxen. The first piece of MD 563 was constructed as a gravel road from MD 224 south to Sandy Point Road in 1934. The next portion of Riverside Road was a disjoint segment from Liverpool Point Road south to Smith Point Road in 1935. The two sections of MD 563 were united in 1936. The fourth segment of Riverside Road, from MD 6 at Riverside west to Maryland Point Road, was built by 1946. MD 563 was completed in 1947 and 1948 with the section of the highway between Maryland Point Road and Smith Point Road. In 1956, the portion of MD 224 from Riverside Road south to MD 6 became MD 344, and MD 224 was extended south along the entire course of MD 563 to MD 6 at Riverside.

== MD 567 ==
Maryland Route 567
- Location: Carney
- Existed: 1935–1998

Maryland Route 567 was the designation for the portion of Cromwell Bridge Road from an arbitrary spot northeast of the road's intersection with MD 542 (Loch Raven Boulevard) east to Cub Hill Road near Carney in eastern Baltimore County. MD 567 was improved as a county highway by 1933. The highway was widened with concrete shoulders and backfilled with macadam between 1933 and 1935. MD 567 was returned to county maintenance in 1998.

== MD 569 ==
Maryland Route 569
- Location: Westminster
- Existed: 1935–1956

Maryland Route 569 was the designation for Old Bachmans Valley Road from Lemmon Road north to near Beggs Road north of Westminster in northern Carroll County. The highway was built as a macadam road in 1934 and 1935. MD 569 was removed from the state highway system in 1956.

== MD 570 ==
Maryland Route 570
- Location: Eldersburg, Fenby
- Existed: 1935–1954

Maryland Route 570 was the designation for a pair of stretches of Old Washington Road in southern Carroll County. The northern piece of MD 570 extended south from MD 32 at Fenby to near Nicodemus Road. The southern segment ran from near O'Brecht Road to Streaker Road through the hamlet of Barrett between the Patapsco River and MD 26 west of Eldersburg. Both stretches of MD 570 were partially constructed as macadam roads in 1935. Both highways were extended south about 0.5 miles (0.80 km) in 1938. The southern section of MD 570 was extended south 0.5 miles (0.80 km) again in 1948. Both segments of MD 570 were replaced by a northern extension of MD 97 in 1954. Part of the northern segment of MD 570 are now part of MD 854.

== MD 571 ==
Maryland Route 571
- Location: Emmitsburg
- Existed: 1935–c. 1950

Maryland Route 571 was the designation for Tract Road from MD 32 (now MD 140) north to the Pennsylvania state line in Emmitsburg in northern Frederick County. The highway was constructed as a macadam road in 1935. MD 571 was removed from the state highway system in or after 1950.

== MD 572 ==
Maryland Route 572
- Location: Gapland
- Existed: 1935–1956

Maryland Route 572 was the designation for Gapland Road from MD 67 at Gapland east to the Washington–Frederick county line at Crampton's Gap on South Mountain. The highway was constructed as a macadam road in 1935. MD 572 was removed from the state highway system in 1956.

== MD 573 ==
Maryland Route 573
- Location: Eldersburg
- Existed: 1935–1954

Maryland Route 573 was the designation for Bartholow Road on either side of Little Morgan Run near Eldersburg in southeastern Carroll County. The highway was constructed as a macadam road in 1935. MD 573 was removed from the state highway system in 1954.

== MD 574 ==
Maryland Route 574
- Location: Hollywood
- Existed: 1935–1983

Maryland Route 574 was the designation for Clarks Landing Road from MD 235 (now MD 944) east to near Scotch Neck Road near Hollywood in central St. Mary's County. The highway was constructed as a gravel road in 1934 and 1935. MD 574 was removed from the state highway system in 1983.

== MD 575 ==
Maryland Route 575
- Location: Huntingtown
- Existed: 1935–1957

Maryland Route 575 was the designation for Pond Woods Road from MD 2 north of Huntingtown east toward Willows in northern Calvert County. The highway was constructed as a gravel road in 1935. MD 575 was removed from the state highway system in 1957.

== MD 576 ==
Maryland Route 576
- Location: Pocomoke City
- Existed: 1935–c. 1954

Maryland Route 576 was the designation for Dunn Swamp Road from Tulls Corner Road north to MD 371 in Pocomoke City in southern Worcester County. The highway was constructed as a macadam road for a short distance south from MD 371 in 1935. MD 576 was extended south to Tulls Corner Road in 1938. The highway was removed from the state highway system in or shortly after 1954.

== MD 580 ==
Maryland Route 580
- Location: West Pocomoke
- Existed: c. 1946–c. 1950

Maryland Route 580 was the designation for Pocomoke River Road from US 13 (now US 13 Business) north to MD 364 in West Pocomoke in southeastern Somerset County. The highway was constructed by Somerset County with state aid as a 12-foot-wide (3.7 m) macadam road by 1915. MD 580 was included in the state highway system by 1946 but was removed in or shortly after 1950.

== MD 581 ==
Maryland Route 581
- Location: Keysville
- Existed: 1935–1954

Maryland Route 581 was the designation for Keysville Bruceville Road, which ran from the center of Keysville south a short distance in northwestern Carroll County. The highway was constructed as a macadam road between 1933 and 1935. MD 581 was removed from the state highway system in 1954.

== MD 582 ==
Maryland Route 582
- Location: Olney
- Existed: 1935–1974

Maryland Route 582 was the designation for Zion Road from Brookeville Road north of MD 108 near Olney north to Gregg Road in northern Montgomery County. The highway was constructed as a macadam road in 1934 and 1935. MD 582 was removed from the state highway system in 1974.

== MD 583 ==
Maryland Route 583
- Location: Florence
- Existed: 1935–c. 1950

Maryland Route 583 was the designation for Jennings Chapel Road from Hipsley Mill Road east to Daisy Road near Florence in western Howard County. The highway was built as a macadam road in 1934 and 1935. MD 583 was removed from the state highway system in or shortly after 1950.

== MD 585 ==
Maryland Route 585
- Location: Salisbury
- Existed: 1935–1956

Maryland Route 585 was the designation for Airport Road from MD 12 north to MD 350 near Salisbury in central Wicomico County. The highway was constructed as a macadam road from MD 12 to the site of what is now Salisbury–Ocean City–Wicomico Regional Airport in 1935. MD 585 was extended to MD 350 by 1950 and removed from the state highway system in 1956.

== MD 590 ==
Maryland Route 590
- Location: Kalmia–Dublin
- Existed: 1934–1954

Maryland Route 590 was the designation for Forge Hill Road from US 1 near Kalmia north to US 1 near Dublin. The highway was constructed as the original state road from Bel Air toward the Susquehanna River; the 14-foot-wide (4.3 m) macadam road was built in 1912 and 1913. This road became part of US 1 in 1927. After US 1 was relocated on either side of Deer Creek to its present course in 1934, MD 590 was applied to the old highway. MD 590 was removed from the state highway system in 1954.

== MD 592 ==
Maryland Route 592
- Location: Rising Sun
- Length: 0.23 mi (370 m)
- Existed: 1935–1958

Maryland Route 592 was the designation for the 0.23-mile-long (0.37 km) stretch of Sylmar Road from MD 273 north to US 1 near Rising Sun in northern Cecil County. US 1 originally followed what is now MD 273 through Rising Sun and then made a right-angle turn north onto Sylmar Road to head into Pennsylvania. In 1935, US 1 was placed on a sweeping curve, now named Half Mile Turn, to avoid the right-angle turn. The bypassed east–west segment became part of MD 273, and the bypassed north–south segment became MD 592. Less than a year after US 1 was placed on its bypass of Rising Sun, MD 592 was transferred from state to county maintenance through a May 8, 1958, road transfer agreement.

== MD 593 ==
Maryland Route 593
- Location: Silver Spring
- Existed: 1934–c. 1950

Maryland Route 593 was the designation for Brunett Avenue and Greenock Road from Sligo Creek Parkway north to MD 193 in Silver Spring in southeastern Montgomery County. The streets were improved with macadam starting in 1934. MD 593 originally did not reach MD 193, but was extended a short distance north in 1949. The highway was removed from the state highway system in or shortly after 1950.

== MD 597 ==
Maryland Route 597
- Location: Silver Spring
- Existed: 1934–1946

Maryland Route 597 was the designation for Forest Glen Road from Dallas Avenue east to US 29 in Silver Spring in southeastern Montgomery County. The highway was built as Fairway Avenue starting in 1934. MD 597 was replaced by an eastward extension of MD 192 by 1946.

== MD 598 ==
Maryland Route 598
- Location: Westover–Princess Anne
- Existed: 1934–1961

Maryland Route 598 was the designation for Old Princess Anne Road from US 13 in Westover north to US 13 (now MD 675) in Princess Anne in northern Somerset County. The highway was constructed as a 12-foot-wide (3.7 m) macadam road from Princess Anne to Kings Creek in 1911. The road was extended south from Kings Creek as a 14-foot-wide (4.3 m) macadam road between 1911 and 1913. The route became part of US 13 in 1927. MD 598 was assigned to the highway after US 13 was relocated to its present course in 1934. MD 598 was removed from the state highway system by 1961.
