= Maryland Route 425 =

State highway in Maryland

Maryland Route 425
- Map of Southern Maryland with MD 425 highlighted in red

Route information
- Maintained by MDSHA
- Length: 11.77 mi (18.94 km)
- Existed: 1930–present
- Tourist routes: Religious Freedom Byway

Major junctions
- South end: MD 6 near Nanjemoy
- MD 6 in Ironsides
- North end: MD 224 in Mason Springs

Location
- Country: United States
- State: Maryland
- Counties: Charles

Highway system
- Maryland highway system; Interstate; US; State; Scenic Byways
← MD 424	→ MD 430

Maryland Route 425 (MD 425) is a state highway in the U.S. state of Maryland. The state highway runs 11.77 miles (18.94 km) from MD 6 near Nanjemoy north to MD 224 in Mason Springs. MD 425 connects Nanjemoy and Ironsides with Pisgah and Mason Springs in western Charles County. The state highway was built as two different routes in the early 1930s: MD 425 from Mason Springs to south of Pisgah, and MD 491 near Nanjemoy. MD 425 and MD 491 were extended to MD 6 in Ironsides in 1950, with MD 425 assuming MD 491 in 1956.

== Route description ==
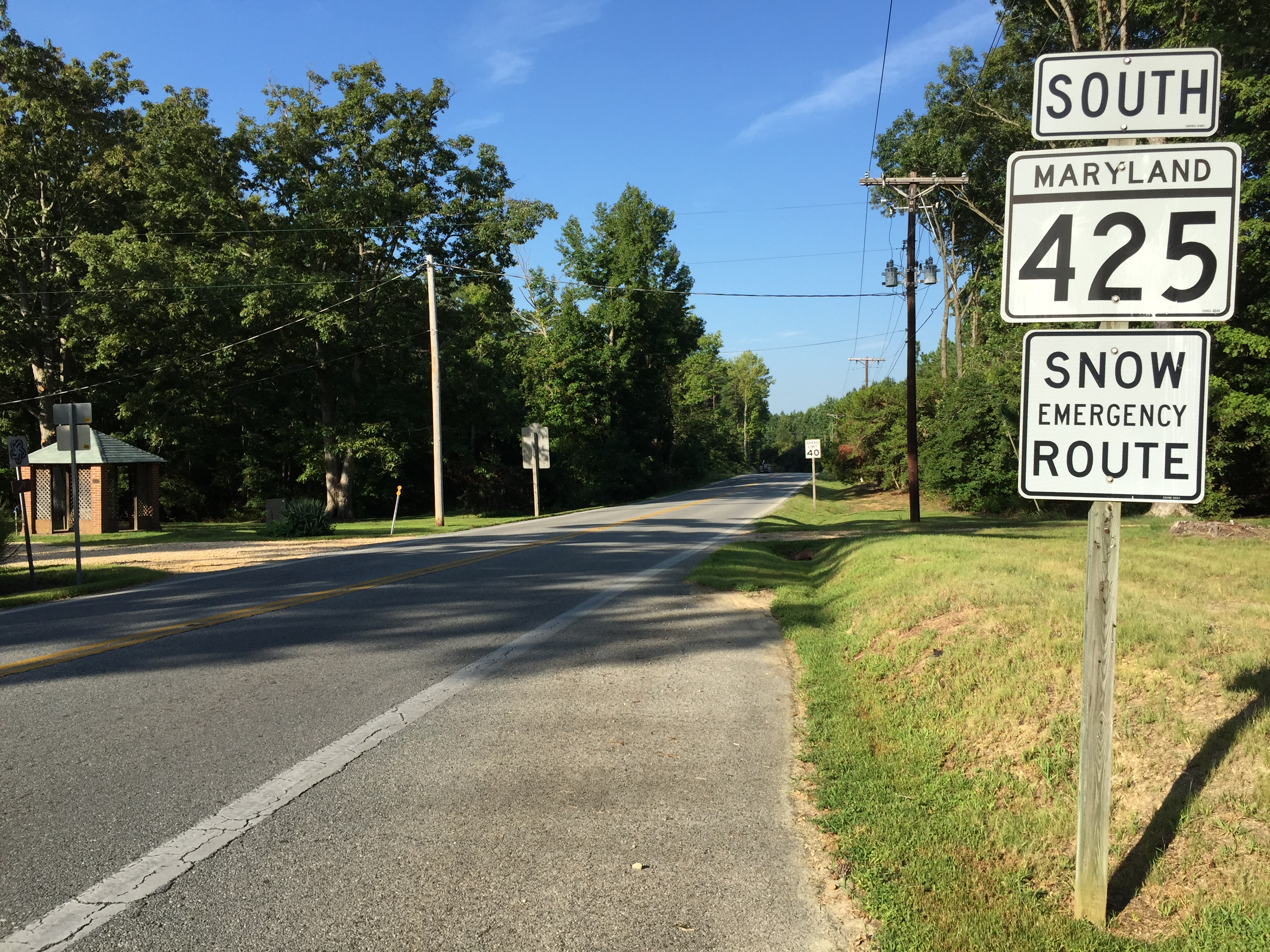
View south along MD 425 at Durham Church Road south of Ironsides

MD 425 begins at an intersection with MD 6 (Port Tobacco Road) south of the community of Nanjemoy and north of the hamlet of Grayton. The state highway heads northeast as two-lane undivided Ironsides Road through a forested area, passing Baptist Church Road and crosses a branch of Hill Top Fork of Nanjemoy Creek. At Durham Church Road, MD 425 makes a 90-degree turn to the north and intersects MD 6 again in the village of Ironsides. The state highway continues north as Mason Springs Road, crossing Jane Berrys Run. MD 425 intersects Bicknell Road and Poorhouse Road in the hamlet of Pisgah and passes the historic home Araby before reaching the highway's northern terminus at MD 224 (Chicamuxen Road) in Mason Springs.

== History ==
Maryland Route 491
- Location: Nanjemoy–Ironsides
- Existed: 1933–1956

The first section of MD 425 was constructed as a gravel road south 2 miles (3.2 km) from Mason Springs in 1930. The highway was extended south another 2 miles (3.2 km) through Pisgah in 1933. Also in 1933, 1 mile (1.6 km) of gravel road was constructed from the Nanjemoy end. This segment was originally designated MD 491. MD 425 was extended with another 2-mile (3.2 km) section in 1934. The courses of MD 425 and MD 491 remained the same until 1950 when MD 425 was extended south to Ironsides and MD 491 was extended north to Ironsides. MD 425 was extended south to Nanjemoy, assuming MD 491's entire course, in 1956.

== Junction list ==
The entire route is in Charles County.

Location	mi	km	Destinations	Notes
Nanjemoy	0.00	0.00	MD 6 (Port Tobacco Road) – Grayton, Nanjemoy	Southern terminus
Ironsides	4.81	7.74	MD 6 (Port Tobacco Road) – Port Tobacco, La Plata	
Mason Springs	11.77	18.94	MD 224 (Chicamuxen Road) – Marbury, Indian Head	Northern terminus
1.000 mi = 1.609 km; 1.000 km = 0.621 mi
