= Maryland Route 224 =

State highway in Maryland, United States

Maryland Route 224
- Maryland Route 224 highlighted in red

Route information
- Maintained by MDSHA
- Length: 26.70 mi (42.97 km)
- Existed: 1927–present
- Tourist routes: Religious Freedom Byway

Major junctions
- South end: MD 6 at Riverside
- MD 344 near Chicamuxen; MD 425 at Mason Springs; MD 225 at Mason Springs
- North end: MD 227 at Pomonkey

Location
- Country: United States
- State: Maryland
- Counties: Charles

Highway system
- Maryland highway system; Interstate; US; State; Scenic Byways
| ← MD 223 | → MD 225 |

Maryland Route 224 (MD 224) is a state highway in the U.S. state of Maryland. The highway runs 26.70 miles (42.97 km) from MD 6 at Riverside north to MD 227 at Pomonkey. MD 224 is a C-shaped route that mostly parallels the Potomac River through southwestern Charles County. The northern part of the highway passes through the villages of Chicamuxen, Rison, Marbury, and Mason Springs on the south side of Mattawoman Creek. MD 224 originally included Livingston Road north from Pomonkey through Accokeek, Piscataway, and Oxon Hill in southwestern Prince George's County to Washington, D.C. This highway connected Washington with Fort Washington and the Naval Proving Ground at Indian Head.

MD 224 was constructed from Mason Springs north to Bryans Road and from Oxon Hill south to Piscataway in the early to mid-1920s. The highway was built from Mason Springs south to Rison in the mid-1920s and completed to its original southern terminus at Doncaster along what is now MD 344 in the late 1920s. MD 224 was completed when the portion through Accokeek was built in the early 1930s. The Riverside–Chicamuxen highway was constructed as MD 563, which began construction in the mid-1930s and was finished in the late 1940s. MD 224 north of Mason Springs was functionally replaced by the construction of what is now MD 210 during World War II and then removed from the state highway system in the mid-1950s. MD 224 replaced MD 563 from Chicamuxen to Riverside in the mid-1950s and was extended to its present northern terminus at Pomonkey in the early 1960s.

== Route description ==
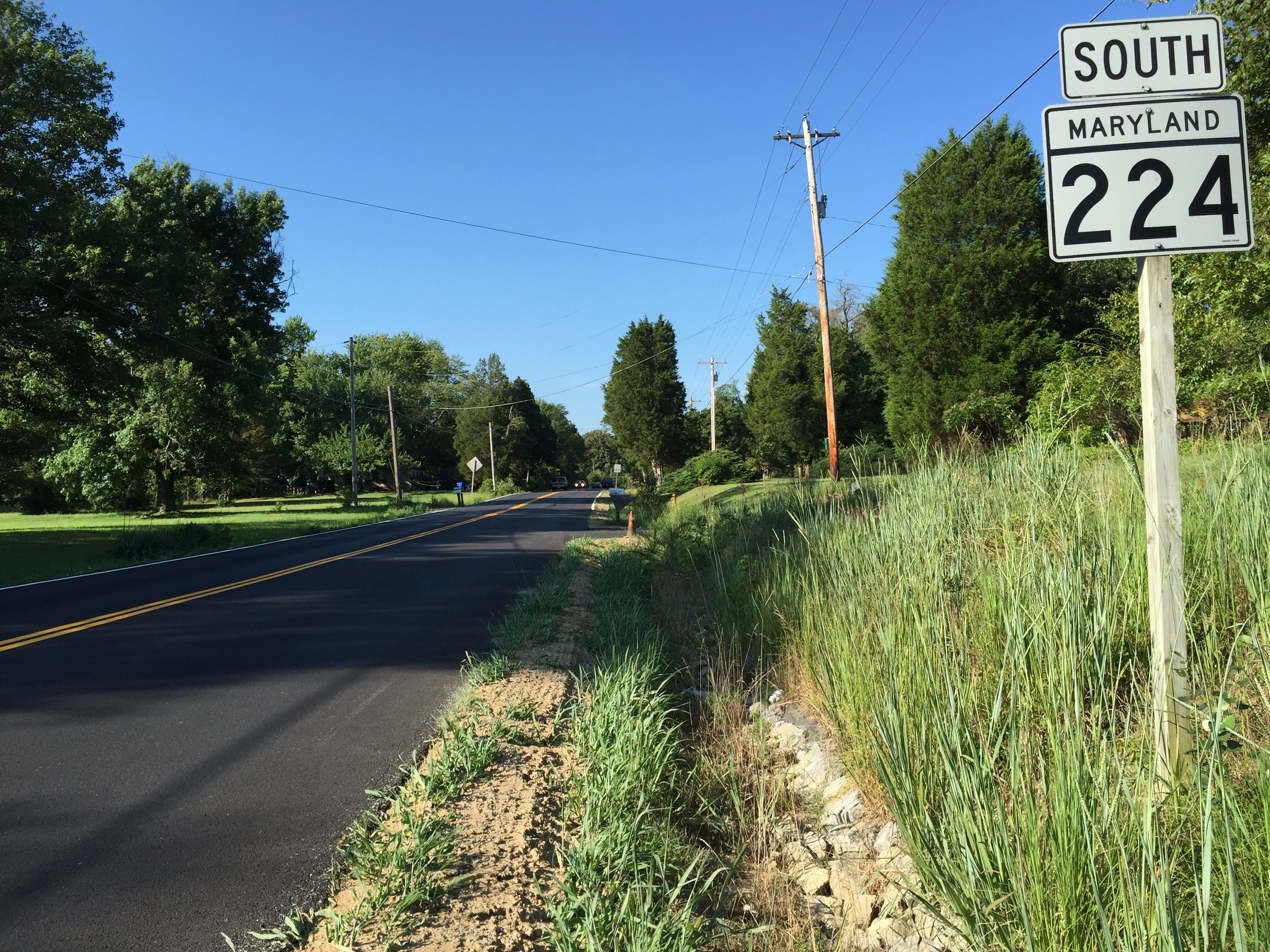
View south at the north end of MD 224 at MD 227 in Pomonkey

MD 224 begins at an intersection with MD 6 (Port Tobacco Road) just north of the latter highway's western terminus at the Potomac River in Riverside. MD 224 heads west as two-lane undivided Riverside Road through densely forested southwestern Charles County, paralleling the left bank of the Potomac River about 1 mile (1.6 km) inland. Near Maryland Point, which is the southernmost point on the portion of Charles County around which the Potomac River flows, the state highway narrows from 22 to 16 feet (6.7 to 4.9 m). West of Maryland Point Road, MD 224 temporarily narrows to 14 feet (4.3 m). The highway crosses Thorne Gut and gradually curves to the north, then passes through the Purse Area of Nanjemoy Wildlife Management Area. The highway widens from 16 feet (4.9 m) at its intersection with Liverpool Point Road west of Nanjemoy. The 10-mile (16 km) portion of MD 224 between MD 6 and Liverpool Point Road had an average annual daily traffic measure of 114 vehicles per day in 2011.

MD 224 continues north parallel to the Potomac River and passes to the east of Mallows Bay. The highway follows Riverside Road to its northern end at Chicamuxen Road, which heads south as MD 344. MD 224 turns north onto Chicamuxen Road and veers east across Reeder Run and through the hamlet of Chicamuxen. MD 224 passes along the southern edge of Chicamuxen Wildlife Management Area and intersects Stump Neck Road, which leads to the Naval Explosive Ordnance Disposal Technology Division. The state highway passes through the villages of Rison, the site of Smallwood State Park, and Marbury, where the road crosses Marbury Run. The state highway passes through Mattawoman Natural Environmental Area, passes north of Henry E. Lackey High School, and intersects the northern end of MD 425 (Mason Springs Road) at Mason Springs before joining MD 225 (Hawthorne Road) to cross Mattawoman Creek. North of the creek, MD 224 turns east onto Livingston Road. The highway intersects the Indian Head Rail Trail and passing Maryland Airport before reaching its northern terminus at MD 227 (Pomfret Road) in the hamlet of Pomonkey. MD 227 continues north on Livingston Road toward Bryans Road.

== History ==
Livingston Road follows much of the course of a road that has connected Charles County and the District of Columbia parallel to the eastern shore of the Potomac River through Prince George's County since the late 18th century. The road became more important as the highway connecting Washington with both Fort Washington and Fort Foote and later the Indian Head Naval Proving Ground, a gunpowder factory and testing area started by the federal government in the late 19th century. At its southern end at Mason Springs, Livingston Road was connected to Indian Head by the La Plata–Indian Head road that later became MD 225. At the District of Columbia boundary in what is now Forest Heights, Livingston Road continued north to Atlantic Street, which connected with Nichols Avenue (now Martin Luther King Jr. Avenue), which headed north to a crossing of the Anacostia River at the site of the 11th Street Bridges. The first segment of Livingston Road in Maryland to be paved as a modern highway was from the District of Columbia boundary south to Oxon Hill Road in Oxon Hill, which was paved by Prince George's County with state aid as a macadam road by 1910. According to the 1878 Hopkins regional Atlas, Livingston Road was so named because the road's District of Columbia section passed a large estate home owned by a Livingston, just before feeding into "Asylum Road" (present Martin Luther King Jr. Avenue) in today's Congress Heights.

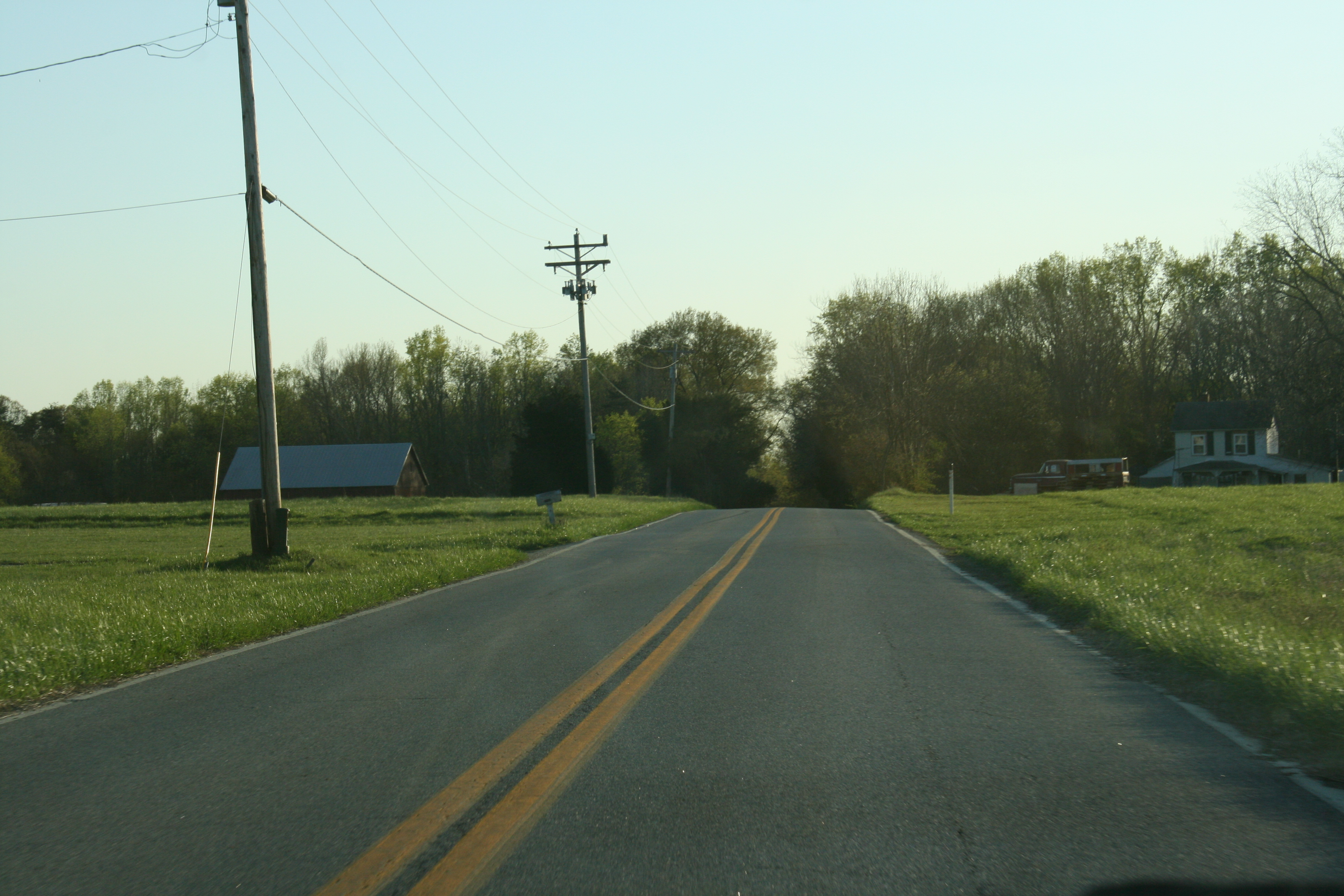
MD 224 southbound on Riverside Road near Chicamuxen

The next section of what is now MD 224 to be improved was the short stretch across Mattawoman Creek on the La Plata–Indian Head road, which was built as a gravel road between 1916 and 1919 and later became MD 225. Livingston Road was improved as a gravel road from Oxon Hill south to Carey Branch south of Oxon Hill by 1921. By 1923, the highway extended south to Fort Washington Road at what was then the village of Silesia. That same year, another section of Livingston Road was graveled from the Charles–Prince George's county line southwest through Pomonkey to Mason Springs. The northern section of Livingston Road was extended south from Silesia to Old Fort Road between 1924 and 1926. The gravel road was extended from there to Piscataway between 1926 and 1928. MD 224 was extended south to Accokeek by 1930. The final piece of Livingston Road from Accokeek to the Charles–Prince George's county line was graveled starting in 1930 and completed by 1933.

Maryland Route 563
- Location: Riverside–Chicamuxen
- Existed: 1934–1956

Chicamuxen Road was constructed as a gravel road from Mason Springs to Rison in 1923. That road was extended to Chicamuxen between 1924 and 1926. MD 224 was completed to its original southern terminus at MD 6 at Doncaster in 1929 and 1930. The first piece of MD 563 was constructed as a gravel road from MD 224 south to Sandy Point Road in 1934. The next portion of Riverside Road was a disjoint segment from Liverpool Point Road south to Smith Point Road in 1935. The two sections of MD 563 were united in 1936. The fourth segment of Riverside Road, from MD 6 at Riverside west to Maryland Point Road, was built by 1946. MD 563 was completed in 1947 and 1948 with the section of the highway between Maryland Point Road and Smith Point Road.

MD 224 was marked from Doncaster to the District of Columbia by 1933. By 1934, MD 224 was proposed to be widened from 16 to 20 feet (4.9 to 6.1 m) from Oxon Hill to Piscataway. The need for upgrades to Livingston Road became acute by 1940 with the greatly increased activity at Fort Washington and the Indian Head Naval Powder Factory in the years before the United States entered World War II. Relief finally came in 1945 and 1946 when the mostly straight Indian Head Highway (now MD 210) was constructed between Washington and Indian Head, replacing the circuitous Livingston Road as the primary highway through the corridor. MD 224 throughout Prince George's County was transferred to county maintenance in 1954 except for the portion of Livingston Road in Accokeek that became part of MD 373.

MD 224 was truncated again at its northern end in 1956 when the remaining Livingston Road portion of the state highway between Mason Springs and Pomonkey was transferred to Charles County maintenance; MD 227 took over the portion of Livingston Road from Pomonkey to Bryans Road as part of its extension north to Marshall Hall along what had been MD 226. At the same time, MD 224 was extended south along what had been MD 563 from Chicamuxen south to Riverside. The Chicamuxen–Doncaster portion of MD 224 was renumbered MD 344 by 1957. The present alignment of the MD 224–MD 225 concurrency and the bridge across Mattawoman Creek were constructed in 1956 and 1957. MD 224 was reconstructed and widened from Mason Springs through Marbury to Rison starting in 1956. The highway's reconstruction from Mason Springs to Rison and on to Chicamuxen was completed in 1959. Sections of the old highway at Mason Springs, Marbury, and Rison became segments of MD 865. The portion of Livingston Road between MD 225 and MD 227 was returned to the state highway system in 1963; MD 224 then assumed its current northern terminus at Pomonkey.

== Junction list ==
The entire route is in Charles County.

| Location | mi | km | Destinations | Notes |
|---|---|---|---|---|
| Riverside | 0.00 | 0.00 | MD 6 (Port Tobacco Road) – La Plata | Southern terminus |
| Chicamuxen | 14.82 | 23.85 | MD 344 south (Chicamuxen Road) – Doncaster | Northern terminus of MD 344; MD 224 turns north onto Chicamuxen Road |
| Mason Springs | 23.22 | 37.37 | MD 425 south (Mason Springs Road) – Pisgah | Northern terminus of MD 425 |
| Mason Springs | 23.36 | 37.59 | MD 225 east (Hawthorne Road) – La Plata | South end of concurrency with MD 225 |
| Mason Springs | 23.76 | 38.24 | MD 225 west (Hawthorne Road) – Indian Head | North end of concurrency with MD 225 |
| Pomonkey | 26.70 | 42.97 | MD 227 (Livingston Road/Pomfret Road) – Bryans Road, Pomfret | Northern terminus |
1.000 mi = 1.609 km; 1.000 km = 0.621 mi: Concurrency terminus
