= Maryland Route 225 =

State highway in Maryland, United States

Maryland Route 225
- Hawthorne Road
- Map of Southern Maryland with MD 225 highlighted in red

Route information
- Maintained by MDSHA
- Length: 10.59 mi (17.04 km)
- Existed: 1927–present
- Tourist routes: Religious Freedom Byway

Major junctions
- West end: MD 210 in Potomac Heights
- MD 224 in Mason Springs
- East end: US 301 in La Plata

Location
- Country: United States
- State: Maryland
- Counties: Charles

Highway system
- Maryland highway system; Interstate; US; State; Scenic Byways
← MD 224	→ MD 227

Maryland Route 225 (MD 225) is a state highway in the U.S. state of Maryland. Known as Hawthorne Road, the state highway runs 10.59 miles (17.04 km) from MD 210 in Potomac Heights east to U.S. Route 301 (US 301) in La Plata. MD 225 connects La Plata, the county seat of Charles County, with Indian Head in the northwestern part of the county, which is home to Indian Head Naval Surface Warfare Center. The state highway was designated one of the original state roads by the Maryland State Roads Commission and constructed in the mid-1910s. MD 225 was reconstructed in the early 1950s, shortly after the highway's western terminus was moved to Potomac Heights following the completion of Indian Head Highway during World War II.

== Route description ==
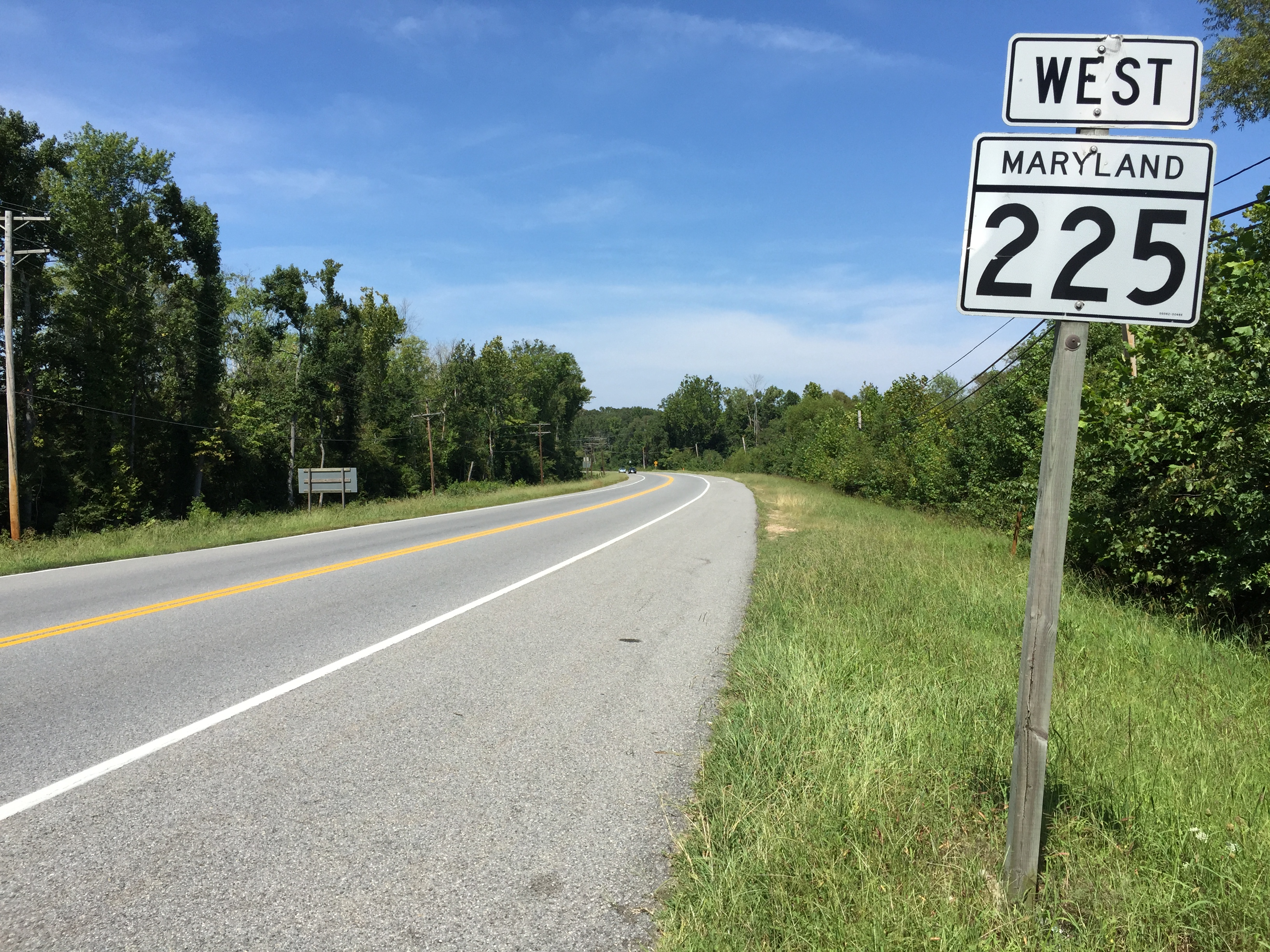
View west along MD 225 at MD 224 in Mason Springs

MD 225 begins at an intersection with MD 210 (Indian Head Highway) in Potomac Heights. The state highway heads south as a two-lane undivided road, descending into the forested bottomlands of Mattawoman Creek, where the highway crosses the Indian Head Rail Trail and intersects MD 224 (Livingston Road). The two highways join in a concurrency to cross the creek into the hamlet of Mason Springs, where MD 224 diverges to the west toward Marbury and MD 225 passes north of the historic home Araby. MD 225 heads southeast along the southern edge of Myrtle Grove Wildlife Management Area to the community of Ripley, where the highway curves east. At the hamlet of Marshalls Corner, the state highway intersects Marshall Corner Road, which heads north to Pomfret, and Rose Hill Road, which provides access to Thomas Stone National Historic Site. MD 225 passes north of the historic home Locust Grove before intersecting Valley Road and Mitchell Road at the corner of the Hawthorne Country Club. Valley Road heads north toward a trio of historic homes—Linden, Mount Carmel Monastery, and Thainston— and the La Plata campus of the College of Southern Maryland. MD 225 enters the town of La Plata, passing through a residential area before heading south of a park and ride lot and reaching its eastern terminus at US 301 (Robert Crain Highway) in a commercial area. The roadway continues east as Hawthorne Drive, the old alignment of MD 225, east to Washington Avenue, the old alignment of US 301.

MD 225 is a part of the National Highway System as a principal arterial from Quailwood Parkway just west of the town of La Plata east to US 301 in La Plata.

== History ==
The La Plata–Indian Head road was one of the original state roads marked for improvement by the Maryland State Roads Commission in 1909. A short section of pavement had already been laid as a state aid road in Potomac Heights by 1910. The highway was constructed as a 14-foot (4.3 m) gravel road from Indian Head to Mason Springs in 1913 and from La Plata to Ripley in 1915. The gap between Mason Springs and Ripley was filled by 1919. In La Plata, the highway's eastern terminus was originally Washington Avenue, which was the original alignment of MD 3 and later US 301. MD 225 originally extended west along Strauss Avenue through Indian Head to the entrance to U.S. Naval Proving Ground. The state highway was supplanted by Indian Head Highway as the main access to the military base when that highway was constructed from Washington, D.C. to Indian Head during World War II. MD 225 was relocated from Strauss Avenue to its present terminus western terminus in Potomac Heights in 1950. The state highway was widened to a 24-foot (7.3 m) road with a bituminous-stabilized gravel surface from La Plata to Ripley in 1949 and 1950 and from Ripley to Potomac Heights in 1951. MD 225 was resurfaced again in 1953 and 1954. MD 225's eastern terminus was rolled back from Washington Avenue to US 301 around 1956.

== Junction list ==
The entire route is in Charles County.

Location	mi	km	Destinations	Notes
Potomac Heights	0.00	0.00	MD 210 (Indian Head Highway) – Indian Head, Washington	Western terminus
Mason Springs	1.23	1.98	MD 224 north (Livingston Road) – Pomonkey	West end of concurrency with MD 224
Mason Springs	1.63	2.62	MD 224 south (Chicamuxen Road) – Marbury	East end of concurrency with MD 224
La Plata	10.59	17.04	US 301 (Robert Crain Highway) / Hawthorne Drive east – Waldorf, Richmond	Eastern terminus
1.000 mi = 1.609 km; 1.000 km = 0.621 mi: Concurrency terminus
