= Maryland Route 344 =

State highway in Maryland, United States

Maryland Route 344
- Chicamuxen Road

Route information
- Maintained by MDSHA
- Length: 2.16 mi (3.48 km)
- Existed: 1957–present

Major junctions
- South end: MD 6 in Doncaster
- North end: MD 224 near Chicamuxen

Location
- Country: United States
- State: Maryland
- Counties: Charles

Highway system
- Maryland highway system; Interstate; US; State; Scenic Byways
← MD 343	→ MD 346

Maryland Route 344 (MD 344) is a state highway in the U.S. state of Maryland. Known as Chicamuxen Road, the state highway runs 2.16 miles (3.48 km) from MD 6 in Doncaster north to MD 224 near Chicamuxen. A connector between MD 6 and MD 224 in western Charles County, MD 344 was originally the southernmost part of MD 224. When MD 224 was rerouted to the west in the mid-1950s, MD 344 was assigned to its present course.

== Route description ==
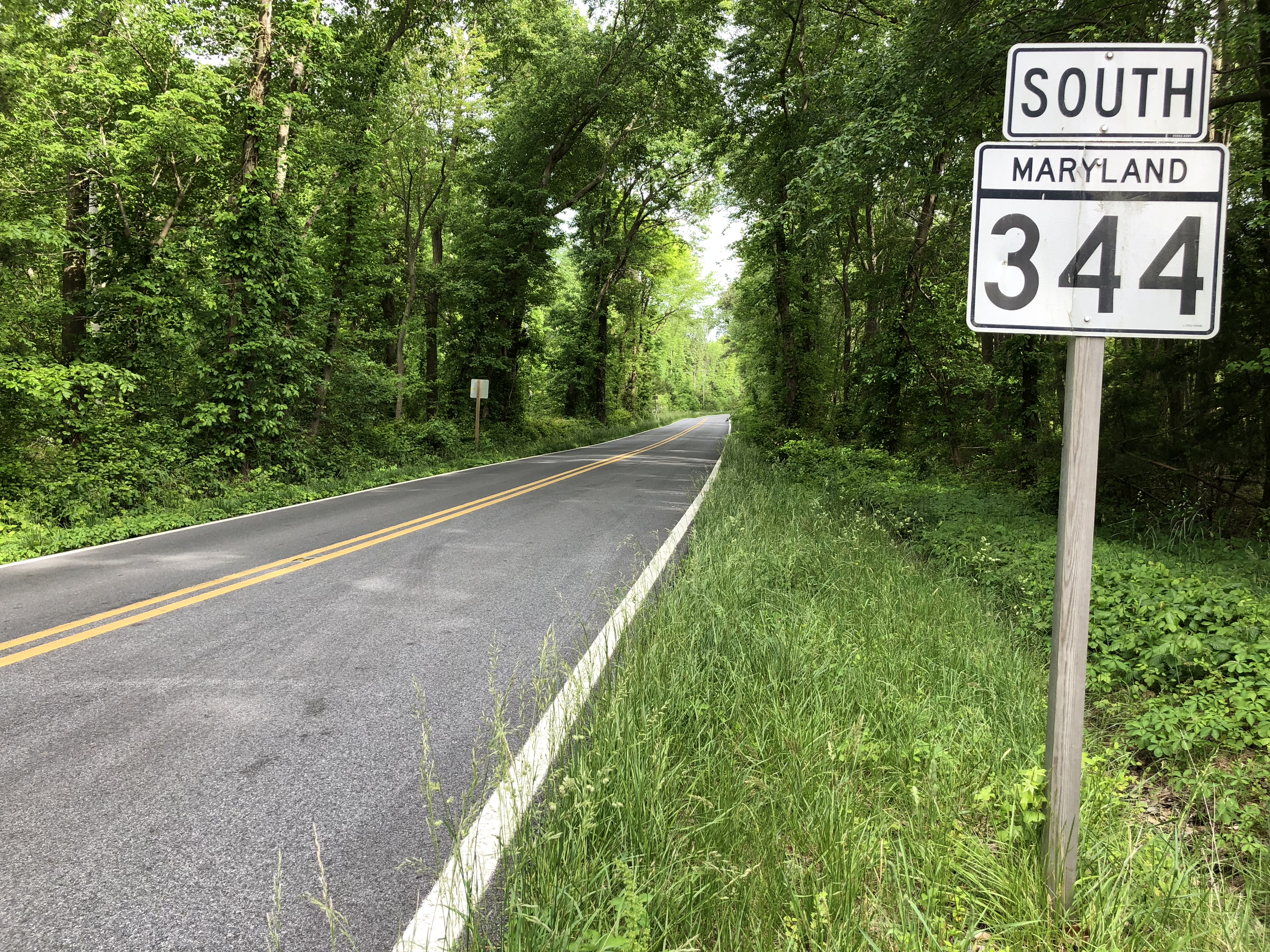
View south along MD 344 at MD 224 near Chicamuxen

MD 344 begins at an intersection with MD 6 (Port Tobacco Road) in the hamlet of Doncaster. County-maintained Gilroy Road is the south leg of the four-way intersection. The state highway heads northwest as a two-lane undivided road through farmland and forest. MD 344 reaches its northern terminus at a T-intersection with MD 224 near Chicamuxen. Northbound MD 224 heads straight as Chicamuxen Road while southbound MD 224 heads west from the intersection as Riverside Road.

== History ==
The highway to which MD 344 is now assigned was originally the southern part of MD 224, which extended north to the District of Columbia boundary in Forest Heights. The Doncaster–Chicamuxen portion of MD 224 was constructed in 1930. When MD 224 was placed onto Riverside Road south to Riverside in 1957, MD 344 was assigned to the portion of Chicamuxen Road south of the MD 224–MD 344 intersection.

== Junction list ==
The entire route is in Charles County.

Location	mi	km	Destinations	Notes
Doncaster	0.00	0.00	MD 6 (Port Tobacco Road) – Ironsides	Southern terminus
Chicamuxen	2.16	3.48	MD 224 (Chicamuxen Road/Riverside Road) – Riverside, Marbury	Northern terminus
1.000 mi = 1.609 km; 1.000 km = 0.621 mi
