= Maryland Route 6 =

State highway in Maryland, US

Maryland Route 6
- Maryland Route 6 highlighted in red

Route information
- Maintained by MDSHA
- Length: 47.38 mi (76.25 km)
- Existed: 1927–present
- Tourist routes: Religious Freedom Byway; Booth's Escape Scenic Byway

Major junctions
- West end: Dead end at Potomac River in Riverside
- MD 224 in Riverside; MD 425 in Nanjemoy; MD 344 in Doncaster; MD 425 in Ironsides; US 301 in La Plata; MD 488 in La Plata; MD 5 in Charlotte Hall
- East end: MD 235 in Oraville

Location
- Country: United States
- State: Maryland
- Counties: Charles, St. Mary's

Highway system
- Maryland highway system; Interstate; US; State; Scenic Byways
← MD 5	→ MD 7

Maryland Route 6 (MD 6) (sometimes called Port Tobacco Road) is a state highway in the U.S. state of Maryland. The state highway runs 47.36 miles (76.22 km) from a dead end at the Potomac River in Riverside east to MD 235 in Oraville. MD 6 connects several small communities in southern Charles County and northern St. Mary's County with U.S. Route 301 (US 301) in La Plata, the county seat of Charles County, and MD 5 in Charlotte Hall. The state highway also provides access to multiple historic sites around Port Tobacco, the original county seat of Charles County. MD 6 was one of the original highways numbered by the Maryland State Roads Commission in 1927. The state highway was constructed from La Plata to Riverside in the late 1910s and early 1920s. The La Plata–Charlotte Hall section of the highway was built in the mid-1920s. The portion of MD 6 east of Charlotte Hall was mostly built in the late 1920s and early 1930s. The final section of the state highway was completed in Oraville in 1940.

== Route description ==
MD 6 begins at a dead end next to the Potomac River in Riverside. The state highway, named Port Tobacco Road, heads straight northwest as a 16 ft (4.9 m) wide roadway between farms. When the road reaches MD 224 (Riverside Road), MD 6 turns north and widens to a two-lane undivided road through a forested area. The state highway veers northwest to cross Nanjemoy Creek, then passes through the hamlet of Grayton and meets the southern end of MD 425 (Ironsides Road). MD 6 continues north through the community of Nanjemoy, crosses Beaverdam Creek, and begins to curve to the east. The state highway intersects MD 344 (Chicamuxen Road) in the hamlet of Doncaster before passing through the Doncaster Demonstration Forest. East of the state forest, MD 6 passes through the village of Ironsides, where the highway intersects MD 425 again. MD 425 heads south as Ironsides Road and north as Mason Springs Road.

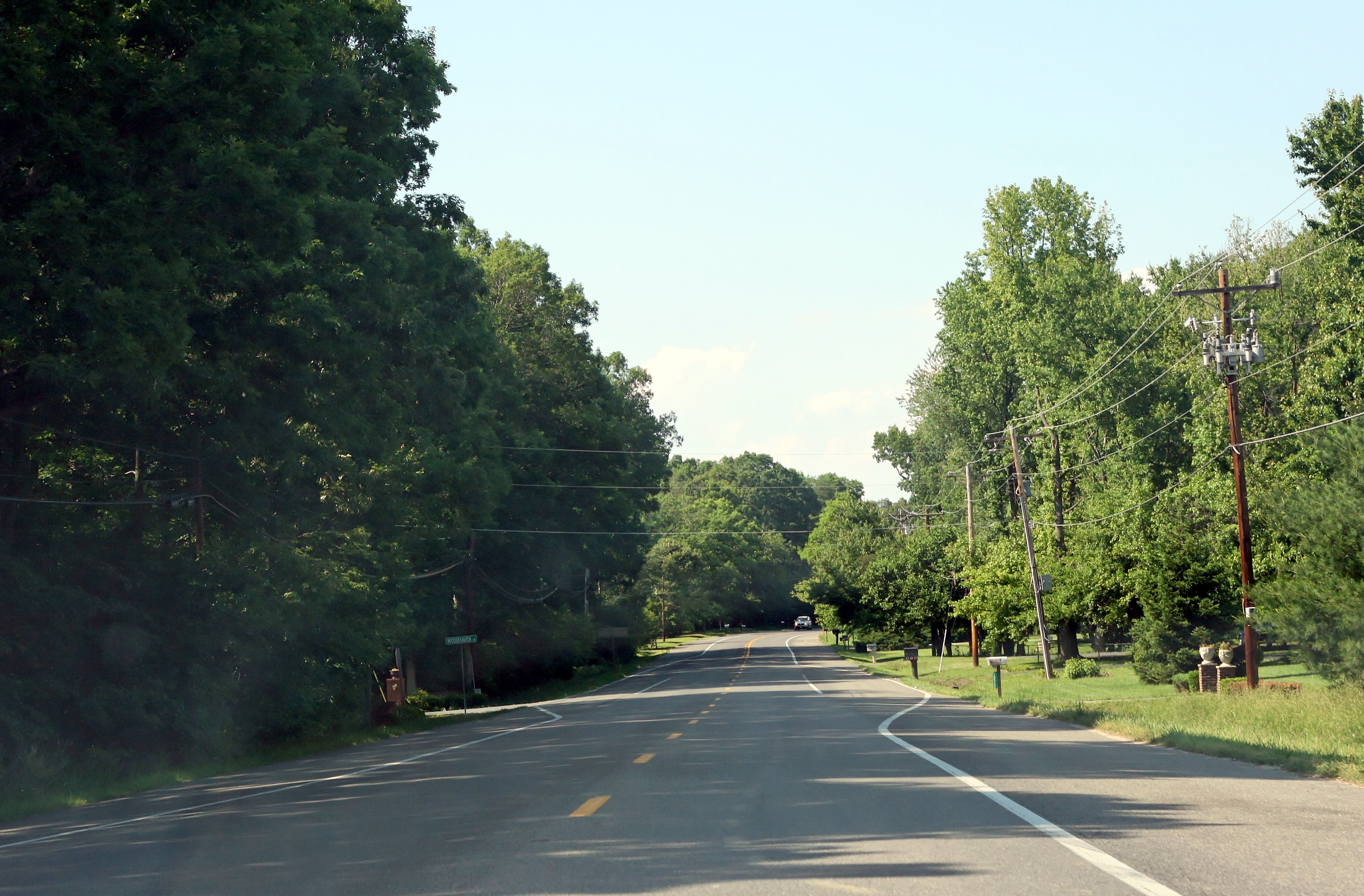
MD 6 westbound east of La Plata

MD 6 continues east, crossing Wards Run and passing through the community of Hill Top. The next village along the state highway is Welcome, where Fire Tower Road heads north toward the historic home Rosemary Lawn. MD 6 crosses Mill Run and continues through McConchie, from which Blossom Point Road splits south along Cedar Point Neck toward the historic home Cedar Grove and Blossom Point Proving Ground. As the state highway approaches Port Tobacco, the highway passes two more historic homes, Ellerslie and Retreat. MD 6 crosses Hoghole Run and intersects Rose Hill Road, which leads north to the namesake home and Thomas Stone National Historic Site. The state highway immediately crosses the Port Tobacco River into Port Tobacco Village, where the highway intersects Chapel Point Road on a tangent. Chapel Point Road leads south through the Port Tobacco Historic District, which includes Stagg Hall, toward St. Thomas Manor and Chapel Point State Park. MD 6 follows the Port Tobacco River northeast, then veers east when Valley Road splits to the north. The state highway passes another historic home, La Grange, before entering the town of La Plata.

MD 6 intersects US 301 (Robert Crain Highway) on the west side of downtown La Plata. The state highway continues east as Charles Street, which passes by the Charles County courthouse, county offices, and the two streets that formed the original alignment of US 301, St. Mary's Avenue heading south and Washington Avenue, which heads north past The Hermitage. MD 6 intersects CSX Transportation's Pope's Creek Subdivision railroad line at-grade, then leaves the downtown area and continues east past the University of Maryland Charles Regional Medical Center and over Clark Run. The state highway intersects MD 488 (La Plata Road) and veers southeast out of the county seat. MD 6 returns to an eastbound trajectory in the village of Newtown, from which Bel Alton Newtown Road splits south past the historic home Rich Hill. The state highway uses a trio of bridges to cross the Zekiah Swamp and passes through the village of Dentsville. MD 6 skirts Gilbert Run Regional Park and traverses Wheatley Run and Gilbert Swamp Run before leaving Charles County.

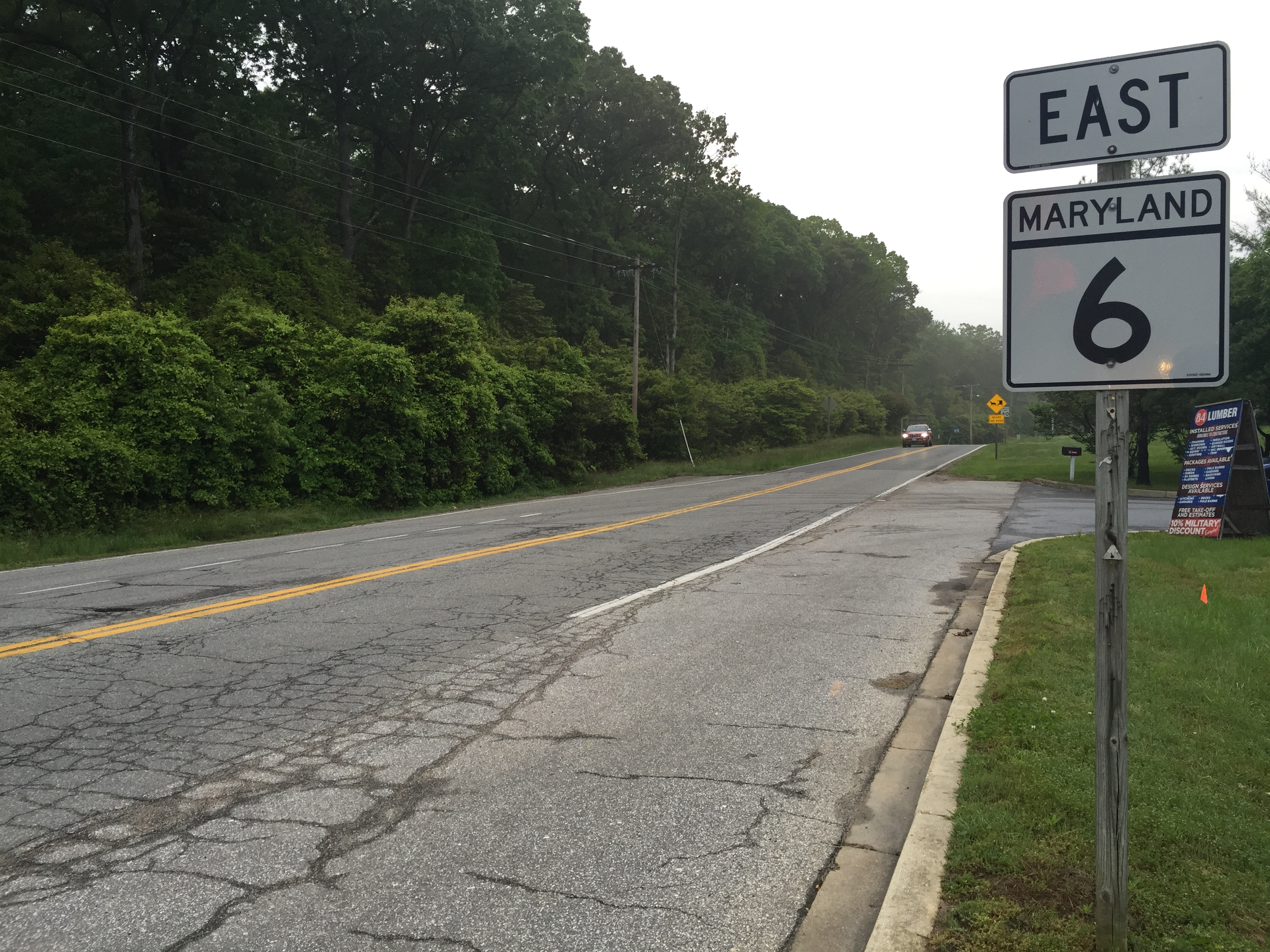
View east along MD 6 near MD 5 in Charlotte Hall

Upon entering St. Mary's County, MD 6 becomes New Market Road. The state highway crosses the Three Notch Trail and enters the community of Charlotte Hall, where the highway intersects the two directions of MD 5 (Three Notch Road) at separate intersections. The Charlotte Hall area is home to an Amish community. MD 6 continues east as New Market–Turner Road to Huntersville, where the highway passes All Faith Church and makes a sharp curve to the north. Immediately after this curve, All Faith Church Road continues straight toward Golden Beach while MD 6 turns east toward the Patuxent River, crossing Locks Swamp Creek. The state highway curves to the south as it arrives in the river's plain and crosses Persimmon Creek, then leaves the river plain and gradually curves to the southwest. MD 6 reaches its eastern terminus at a directional crossover intersection with MD 235 (Three Notch Road) in Oraville, opposite county-maintained Morganza Turner Road.

MD 6 is a part of the National Highway System as a principal arterial from US 301 east to Prospect Hill Road within the town of La Plata.

== History ==
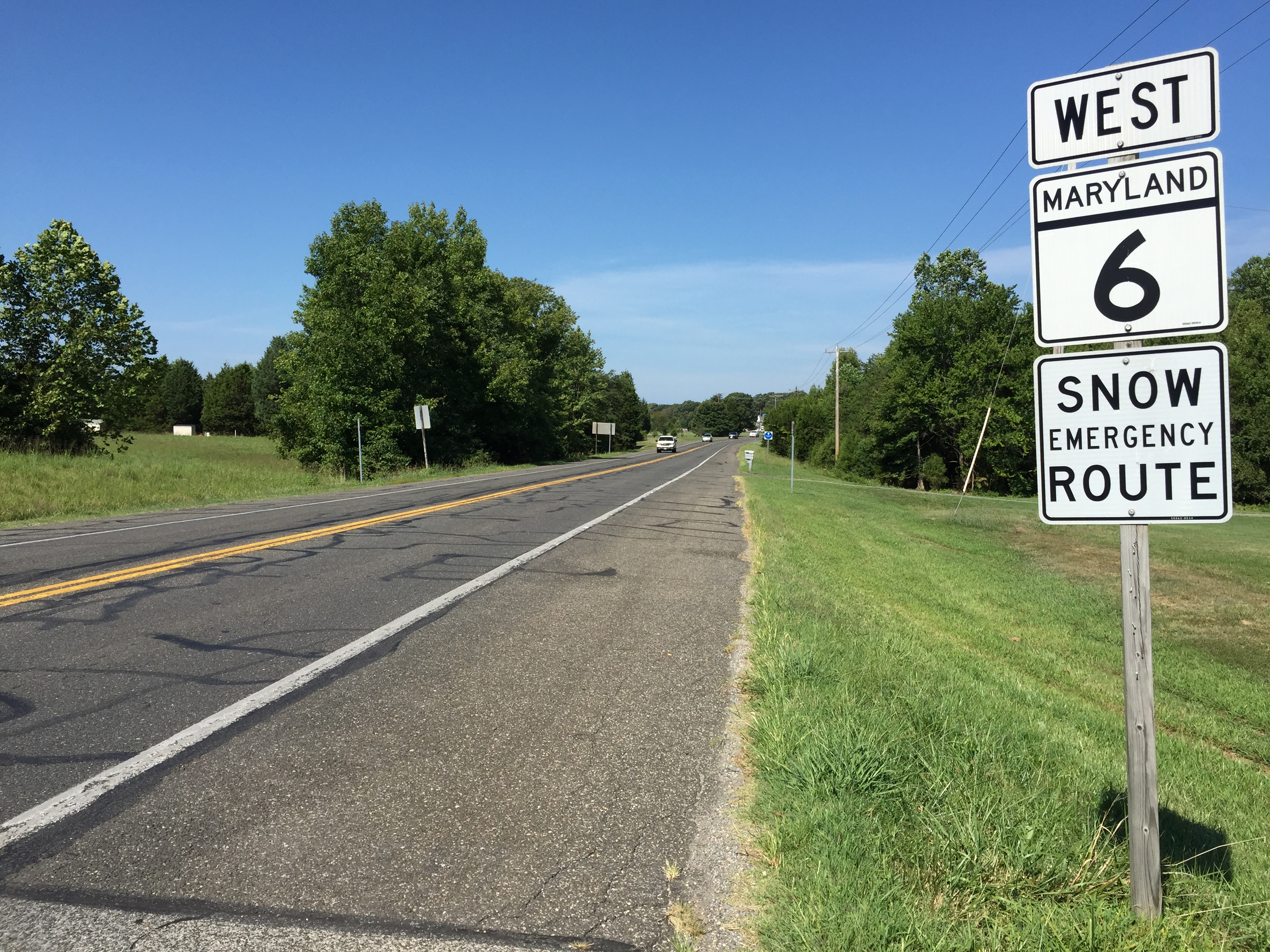
MD 6 westbound in Dentsville

The La Plata–Riverside portion of MD 6 was constructed as a state-aid gravel road beginning around 1916. The highway had reached McConchie and was under construction west to Doncaster by 1919. The road was completed to Nanjemoy Creek by 1921 and finished to Riverside by 1923. The La Plata–Charlotte Hall section of MD 6 was constructed from Charlotte Hall west to Dentsville by 1923. The highway was completed as a 15-foot (4.6 m) wide gravel road west to La Plata in 1926. The highway from Riverside to Charlotte Hall received its state highway designation in 1927 when numbers were first assigned to highways in Maryland.

Construction on the Charlotte Hall–Oraville portion of MD 6 began in 1926. The highway was constructed in 1-mile (1.6 km) segments in 1927 and 1928. MD 6 was extended east through Huntersville to Lock Swamp Creek in 1930. The state highway was extended to Persimmon Creek in 1933 and to Delabrooke Road north of Oraville in 1934. The final section of MD 6 was completed from Delabrooke Road south to MD 235 in Oraville in 1940. The first improvement project on MD 6 was between Doncaster and Hilltop when the gravel road was rebuilt and received a 20-foot (6.1 m) wide bituminous surface. In 1949, the state highway was relocated and a new bridge was constructed near Port Tobacco, replacing a dangerous curve and one-way bridge. MD 6 was widened and resurfaced with bituminous concrete through downtown La Plata in 1951. In 1955 and 1956, MD 6 from US 301 west to McConchie was reconstructed as the westbound direction of an ultimate divided highway that was proposed. Aside from minor improvements, there have been no significant changes in MD 6, such as the construction of a divided highway west of La Plata, since the 1950s.

== Junction list ==
County	Location	mi	km	Destinations	Notes
Charles	Riverside	0.00	0.00	Dead end at Potomac River	Western terminus
Charles	Riverside	0.73	1.17	MD 224 north (Riverside Road) – Maryland Point	Southern terminus of MD 224
Charles	Nanjemoy	5.67	9.12	MD 425 north (Ironsides Road) – Ironsides	Southern terminus of MD 425
Charles	Doncaster	10.95	17.62	MD 344 north (Chicamuxen Road) – Chicamuxen	Southern terminus of MD 344
Charles	Ironsides	13.88	22.34	MD 425 (Mason Springs Road/Ironsides Road) – Pisgah, Nanjemoy	
Charles	La Plata	25.21	40.57	US 301 (Robert Crain Highway) – Waldorf, Richmond	
Charles	La Plata	26.54	42.71	MD 488 east (La Plata Road) – Bryantown	Western terminus of MD 488
St. Mary's	Charlotte Hall	39.01	62.78	MD 5 south (Three Notch Road) – Leonardtown	
St. Mary's	Charlotte Hall	39.06	62.86	MD 5 north (Three Notch Road) – Waldorf	
St. Mary's	Oraville	47.38	76.25	MD 235 (Three Notch Road) – Lexington Park, Waldorf	Eastern terminus
1.000 mi = 1.609 km; 1.000 km = 0.621 mi
