= Rison, Maryland =

Unincorporated community in Maryland, United States

- Unincorporated community
- Location within the state of Maryland Rison (the United States)
- Coordinates: 38°32′56″N 77°10′38″W
- Country: United States
- State: Maryland
- County: Charles
- Elevation: 50 ft (15 m)
- Time zone: UTC-5 (Eastern (EST))
  - Summer (DST): UTC-4 (EDT)
- GNIS feature ID: 591135

Rison is an unincorporated community in Charles County, Maryland, United States. The Rison post office was established in 1905, but the area's residents are now part of the 20640 zip code area for nearby Indian Head. The community's elevation is 50 feet and it had a population of 50 in 1941. Revolutionary War General William Smallwood's home is preserved at Smallwood State Park in Rison along the Mattawoman Creek. Sweden Point Marina, site of major fishing tournaments, is located within the park, and used to be known as Sweetman's Landing. The site of historic Grinder's Wharf, in the mid-19th century an active steamship port for the Washington Steamship Lines, is off Upham Road in Rison. The residential subdivision Rison Acres was platted in 1973, the same year as the nearby Smallwood Estates subdivision. From 1955 to 2000, Robert Linkins, born in Rison, operated a one-man sawmill in Rison; the dirt road to his sawmill is now officially Linkins Road on Maryland State Route 224. Linkins died in 2008.
