= Nanjemoy, Maryland =

Unincorporated community in Maryland, United States

- Unincorporated community
- Location in Maryland Nanjemoy (the United States)
- Coordinates: 38°27′17″N 77°13′01″W
- Country: United States
- State: Maryland
- County: Charles
- Time zone: UTC-5 (Eastern (EST))
  - Summer (DST): UTC-4 (EDT)
- ZIP codes: 20662

Nanjemoy is a settlement along Maryland Route 6 in southwestern Charles County, Maryland, United States, and the surrounding large rural area more or less bounded by Nanjemoy Creek to the east and north, and the Potomac River to the south and west.

== Geography ==
Nanjemoy is within the Washington, D.C., metropolitan area, approximately 25 miles (40 km) south of the Capital Beltway (Interstates 95 and 495).

The area is served by Maryland Route 6 and other two-lane state highways; the nearest major roads are Maryland Route 210 to the north and U.S. Route 301 to the east. The Nanjemoy area is becoming increasingly popular with Washington-area commuters, particularly those working in nearby Indian Head or Fort Washington in Maryland or in Alexandria, Virginia. The Waldorf, Maryland and La Plata, Maryland, commercial areas are nearby to the east, along U.S. 301. No rail lines presently serve the area. Other settlements in the Nanjemoy area include Grayton, Maryland Point, and Riverside. Chicamuxen, Doncaster, and Ironsides are nearby to the north.

The settlement lends its name to the Nanjemoy Formation, which outcrops on the nearby shores of the Potomac River. Other fossiliferous formations which outcrop nearby are the Aquia and basal Calvert Formations.

== Economy ==
The village center includes a Post Office and a county-operated community center building that serves the area's population. The area has two children's camps and a sheriffs' training facility. Much of the Nanjemoy area is forest or farmland. Tobacco was formerly commonly cultivated in the area, but is now rarely grown there.

== History ==
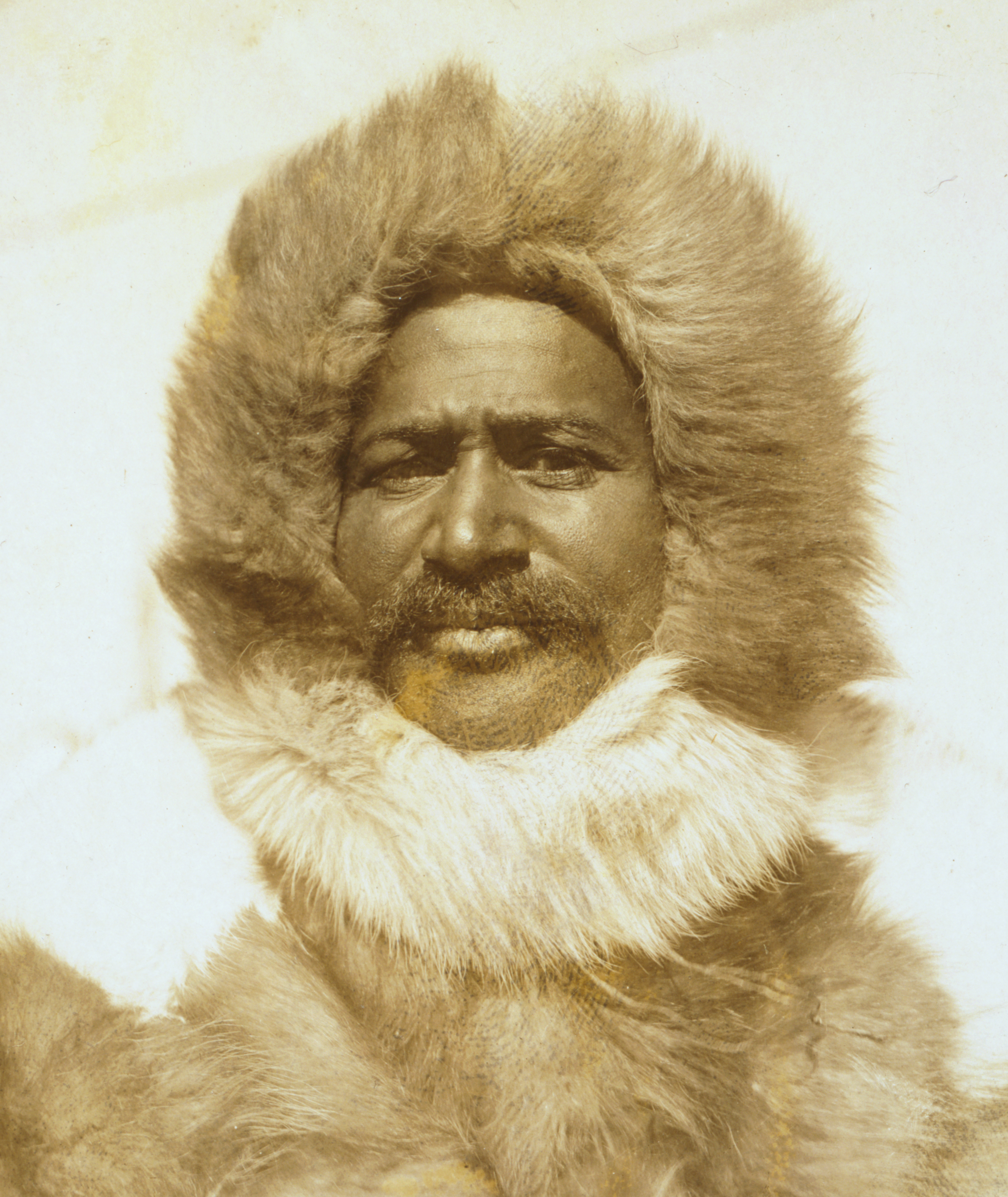
Arctic explorer Matthew Henson, photographed in 1910

Nanjemoy and the creek draw their names from a sub-group of the Piscataway people.

Captives recently arrived from Gambia in the snow Peggy, captained by William Sharp, were offered for sale at Nanjemoy from July 30-August 3, 1770. The sale was arranged by Barnes and Ridgate, of Port Tobacco.

The Confederate-sympathizing area saw occupation by a large force of the Union army during the early part of the American Civil War, with an encampment of about 12,000 soldiers near Chicamuxen, a few miles (kilometers) north of the Nanjemoy area.

In the last years of World War I, the Allied sea-power had been weakened by German submarines. The U.S. military used wooden ships, many of which were built and anchored in Widewater, Virginia, but the war ended before they could be used. Most ships were moved across the Potomac River to a secluded bay called Mallows Bay that served as a junkyard. Some were deconstructed but most of the ships sank. In 1970 a representative from the Audubon Society testified that the wrecks had become an "integral part of the ecosystem." In the 1990s the area was found to contain longboats from the Revolutionary era and modern ships. The State of Maryland placed Mallows Bay in a protected status in 2002, and in September 3, 2019 the bay became part of the Mallows Bay–Potomac River National Marine Sanctuary. The sunken hulls of dozens of the ships still are visible at low tide at Mallows Bay, and they are regarded as the "largest shipwreck fleet in the Western Hemisphere."

Famous people born in Nanjemoy include Raphael Semmes, captain of the Confederate cruiser CSS Alabama, and Matthew Henson, with whom Robert Peary explored the Arctic in 1909 and who with Peary may have discovered the North Pole.

== Wild areas ==
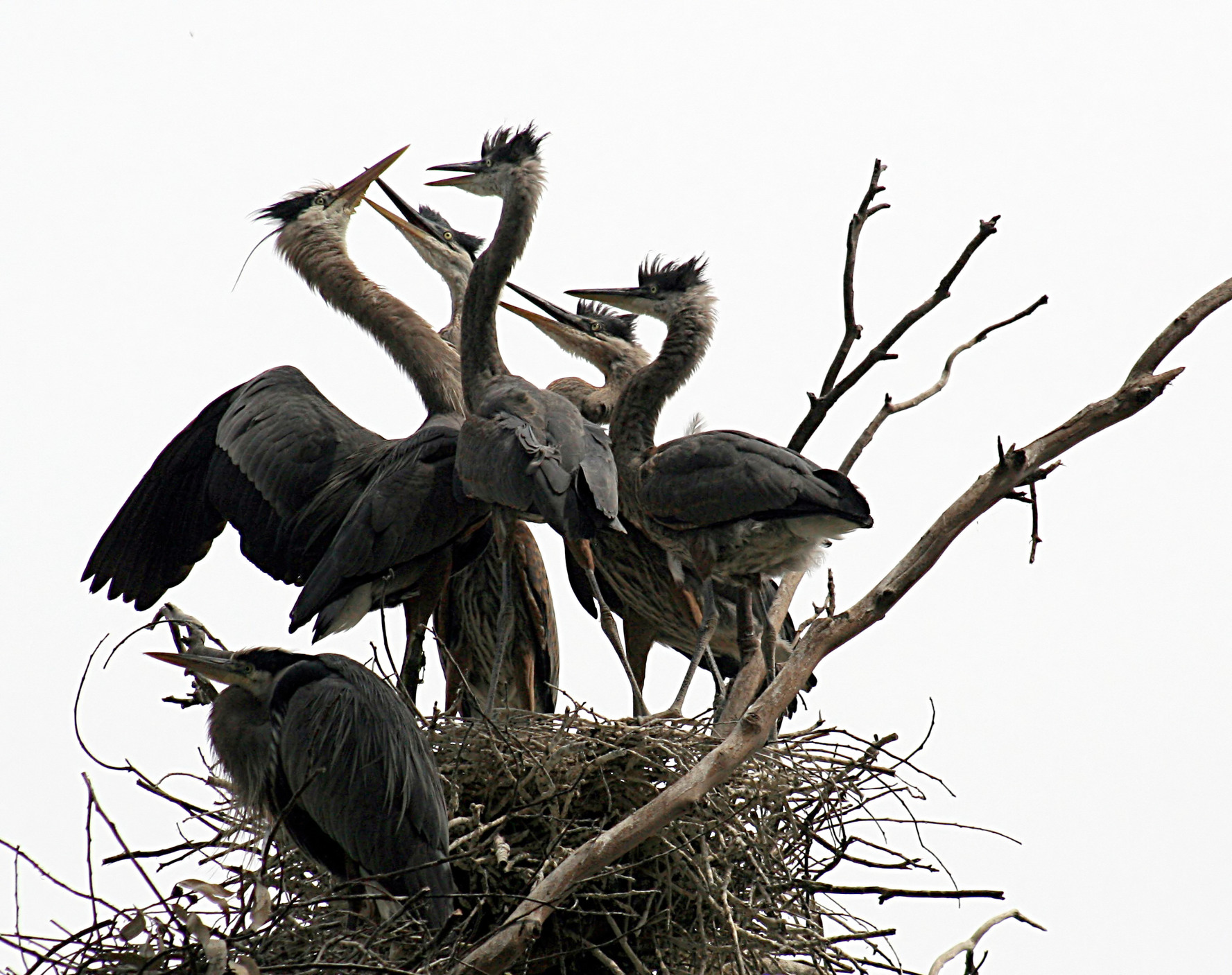
Great blue herons at a nest

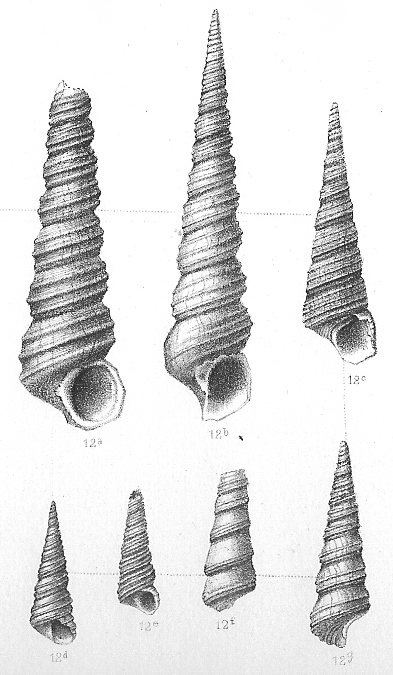
Fossil specimens of a Turritella snail

The Nanjemoy area, on the Atlantic Coastal Plain, includes the largest great blue heron (Ardea herodias) rookery in the Eastern United States north of Florida, now a preserve owned and managed by The Nature Conservancy.

The area also includes Purse State Park, well known for its fossil shark teeth, Turritella snails, and other fossils of Paleocene geological age, and other protected wild areas along the Potomac River's freshwater tidal (estuarine) shore. Smallwood State Park, the Chicamuxen Wildlife Management Area, the Doncaster Demonstration Forest and Chapel Point State Park are also nearby.

The Nanjemoy Creek Environmental Education Center, operated by the Charles County Public School system, is located along Nanjemoy Creek. It offers trails, a boardwalk through a freshwater tidal marsh, a pier, a pavilion, a laboratory building, and several cabins for use by school groups. An observatory there, operated by the Southern Maryland Astronomical Society, has a dome formerly used nearby at a U.S. Naval Research Laboratory facility.

== Recreation ==
Hunting and fishing have long been popular in the relatively undeveloped Nanjemoy area, and many miles of remote hiking trails are available. More recently, the area's scenic, little-traveled roads have become popular with cyclists.

Public boat landings are provided on the Potomac at Mallows Bay and on the estuarine portion of Nanjemoy Creek at Friendship Landing, the latter also popular for fishing. Recreational boaters, mostly from the Woodbridge and Quantico areas on the Virginia side of the Potomac, frequently visit the extensive undeveloped river shore in the Purse State Park area. Kayaking is also increasing in popularity in the area, both on the Potomac and on the quiet tidewaters of Nanjemoy Creek.

== Notable people ==
- Raphael Semmes, captain of the Confederate Navy ship CSS Alabama.
- Matthew Henson, Arctic explorer.
