= Marbury, Maryland =

Unincorporated community in Maryland, United States

- Unincorporated community
- Location within the state of Maryland Marbury (the United States)
- Coordinates: 38°34′31″N 77°09′21″W
- Country: United States
- State: Maryland
- County: Charles
- Time zone: UTC-5 (Eastern (EST))
  - Summer (DST): UTC-4 (EDT)
- ZIP code: 20658
- GNIS feature ID: 590737

Marbury is an unincorporated community in Charles County, Maryland, United States. It has been designated the zip code of 20658. Marbury is located 6.3 miles from Indian Head on Maryland Route 224.

Marbury was the point at which the tornado of April 28, 2002 touched down, before traveling east to demolish much of La Plata. Marbury is located at 38°34′31″N 77°09′21″W (38.575278, -77.155833)

== Attractions ==
Smallwood State Park, named for William Smallwood, is located in nearby Rison. Smallwood's Retreat, Sweden Point Marina, and an art gallery are located in the park. Smallwood State Park has hosted numerous fishing tournaments, including events in the Bass Anglers Sportsman Society's Bassmasters series.

== Schools ==
Gale-Bailey Elementary School is located in Marbury. Middle- and high-school students attend General Smallwood Middle School and Henry E. Lackey High School.

== Demographics ==
Election district 10, which includes Marbury, had 3234 residents as of 2000. That is a wider area than Marbury itself; other sources say it has 913 residents.

== Notable person ==
Phyllis Reynolds Naylor vacationed with her paternal grandparents, who lived in Marbury during the 1930s.
