= Doncaster Demonstration Forest =

State park in Maryland, United States

Coordinates: 38°30′19.5″N 77°11′56″W

Doncaster Demonstration Forest is a state park in Charles County of the state Maryland. The park is 1,447 acres (586 ha) in size. It serves as an educational resource where a variety of silvicultural practices, forest best management practices and wildlife habitat management practices are implemented and studied. Recreational opportunities in Doncaster include hunting, hiking, horseback riding and mountain biking. It contains about 13 miles (21 km) of marked trails.

== Location ==
Doncaster Demonstration Forest is located at Nanjemoy in Charles County, Maryland. It is on the north side of Port Tobacco Road, due east of Gilroy Road, and the west side of Gilroy Road, south of the Gilroy Road and Port Tobacco road intersection. Doncaster is 12 miles (19 km) west of La Plata off of Maryland Route 6.
