= Riverside, Charles County, Maryland =

Unincorporated community in Maryland, United States

Riverside, Maryland
- Unincorporated community
- Location within the state of Maryland Riverside (the United States)
- Coordinates: 38°23′16″N 77°8′47″W
- Country: United States
- State: Maryland
- County: Charles
- Time zone: UTC-5 (Eastern (EST))
  - Summer (DST): UTC-4 (EDT)

Riverside is an unincorporated community in Charles County, Maryland, United States, located around the intersection of Maryland routes 6 and 224 beside the Potomac River. It is considered part of the greater Nanjemoy community. Although quite isolated today, for many generations Riverside was the site of a general store serving riverboat travelers. It is listed in the Maryland Inventory of Historic Properties as the Riverside Historic District.
