= Mason Springs, Maryland =

Unincorporated community in Maryland, United States

- Unincorporated community
- Location within Maryland
- Coordinates: 38°35′03″N 77°07′08″W
- Country: United States
- State: Maryland
- County: Charles
- Elevation: 10 ft (3.0 m)
- Time zone: UTC-5 (Eastern (EST))
  - Summer (DST): UTC-4 (EDT)
- Area codes: 301 & 240
- GNIS feature ID: 585730

Mason Springs is an unincorporated community in Charles County, Maryland, United States. Mason Springs is located at the junction of Maryland routes 224 and 225, 1.8 miles (2.9 km) southeast of Potomac Heights. The community had a post office from 1890 to 1924.

Araby, a house on the National Register of Historic Places, is located in Mason Springs.
