= Mattawoman Creek =

Coastal plain tributary in Maryland, United States

Coordinates: 38°34′10″N 77°11′0″W

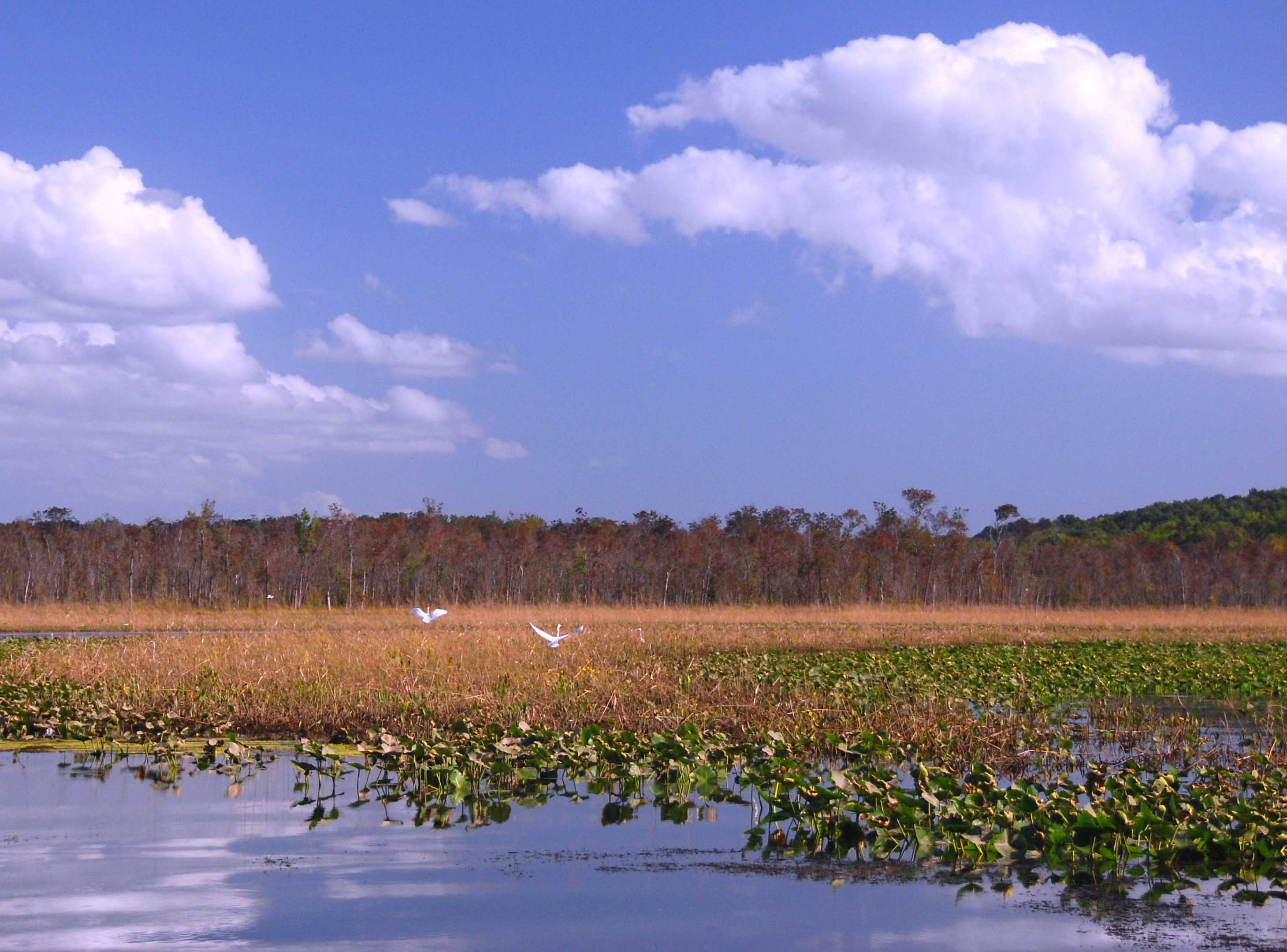
- Freshwater-tidal estuary of Mattawoman Creek

Location
- Country: United States
- State: Maryland
- Counties: Charles and Prince George's counties

Physical characteristics
- Mouth
  - location: Potomac River
  - elevation: 0 feet (0 m)
- Length: 30.0 mi (48.3 km)

Mattawoman Creek is a 30.0-mile-long (48.3 km) coastal-plain tributary to the tidal Potomac River with a mouth at Indian Head, Maryland, 20 miles (32 km) downstream of Washington, D.C. It comprises a 23-mile (37 km) river flowing through Prince George's and Charles counties and a 7-mile (11 km) tidal-freshwater estuary in Charles County. About three-fourths of its 94-square-mile (240 km^{2}) watershed lies in Charles County, with the remainder in Prince George's County immediately to the north.

== History ==
Mattawoman appears on Capt. John Smith's circa-1608 map as Mataughquamend, an Algonquian compound translated as “where one goes pleasantly.” Today, Mattawoman Creek is listed by the Environmental Protection Agency (EPA) as impaired under Section 303(d) of the Clean Water Act for excess nutrients, sediment, and loss of living resources. At the same time, because it is the southernmost Potomac River freshwater estuary in Maryland, Mattawoman has escaped much of the degradation associated with urbanization spreading from Washington, D.C. It retains noteworthy biodiversity.

== Fish ==
Assessments of fish communities throughout the Chesapeake Bay system by the Maryland Department of Natural Resources find the Mattawoman estuary to be the most productive of sampled tributaries for migratory fish. Especially abundant are anadromous alewife, blueback herring and American shad and semi-anadromous white and yellow perch. The largemouth bass, a resident gamefish that supports an active recreational fishery in the tidal freshwater Potomac River and its tributaries, also achieves high concentrations in the estuary. On the basis of fish assessments, Maryland fisheries biologists have concluded that

Mattawoman represents as near to ideal conditions as can be found in the northern Chesapeake Bay, perhaps unattainable in other systems, and should be protected from overdevelopment.

== Marshes ==
The estuary supports extensive freshwater tidal marshes that are partially protected as Maryland Wildlands and as Natural Environment Areas. Palustrine wetlands are concentrated in the broad stream valley of the fluvial reaches, where a site with the greatest species richness of amphibians and reptiles in Maryland has been identified by the Department of Natural Resources.

== Watershed ==
Mattawoman drains the town of Indian Head, the town of Bryans Road, and most of Waldorf, the largest community in Charles County. Its watershed remains over 50% forested, but it is approaching a 10% impervious cover, often cited as a threshold for significant degradation as measured by water quality and species diversity. Continued loss of forest and increases in impervious cover are anticipated, as most of the watershed in Charles County falls within a designated development district, which at about 83 square miles (210 km^{2}) (214 km^{2}) is larger than Washington D.C. (61 square miles; 158 km^{2}). With respect to projected growth, the Mattawoman Creek Watershed Management Plan authored by the U.S. Army Corps of Engineers notes that

[t]hese intense development practices would have severe repercussions on the biological community and would decrease the habitat quality within the estuary.

== Natural resources ==
The quality of Mattawoman’s living resources are acknowledged by Charles County government, while the juxtaposition of high quality and high vulnerability to development are recognized by state and federal agencies. For example, the Mattawoman Creek Watershed Management Plan states:

The Mattawoman Creek represents an important natural resource, with a diverse network of forests, tributaries, and wetlands, providing tremendous fish and wildlife habitat. The ecological integrity of the Mattawoman is at risk from current and future development pressures within the watershed.

The juxtaposition of value and vulnerability has caused the creek and its watershed to become a focal point for regional and local conservation organizations that work to restore the Chesapeake Bay in the face of growing urbanization, which studies find contribute to the decline of the Bay.

== Highway crossing proposals ==
Proposals for two four-lane highways that would cross the fluvial stream, and the expected attendant development, generated debate. The first, the Western Waldorf Bypass, is one of three alternatives being considered by state and federal agencies for the U.S. 301 Waldorf-Area Transportation Improvements Project. This highway would have divided lengthwise about one-half of the Mattawoman watershed. The second, for which controversial wetlands permit applications were submitted, was a proposed extension of Charles County’s Cross County Connector, which would have crossed the width of the watershed. In 2012 the Army Corps of Engineers denied the wetlands permit application, ending the proposal.

== Variant names ==
According to the Geographic Names Information System, Mattawoman Creek has also been known by the following names.

- Mataughquamend
- Matawoman Creeke
- Matawomen Creeke
- Mattawomans Creek
- Mattawomen Creek
- Pangayo
- Saint Thomas Creeke
- Zachia Swamp

== See also ==
- List of Maryland rivers
