= Chicamuxen, Maryland =

Unincorporated community in Maryland, United States

- Unincorporated community
- Location within Maryland
- Coordinates: 38°32′14″N 77°12′44″W
- Country: United States
- State: Maryland
- County: Charles
- Elevation: 82 ft (25 m)
- Time zone: UTC-5 (Eastern (EST))
  - Summer (DST): UTC-4 (EDT)
- Area codes: 301 & 240
- GNIS feature ID: 589969

Chicamuxen is an unincorporated community in Charles County, Maryland, United States. Chicamuxen is located along Maryland Route 224, 1.5 miles (2.4 km) east of Linton Point.
