= La Plata, Maryland =

- Town
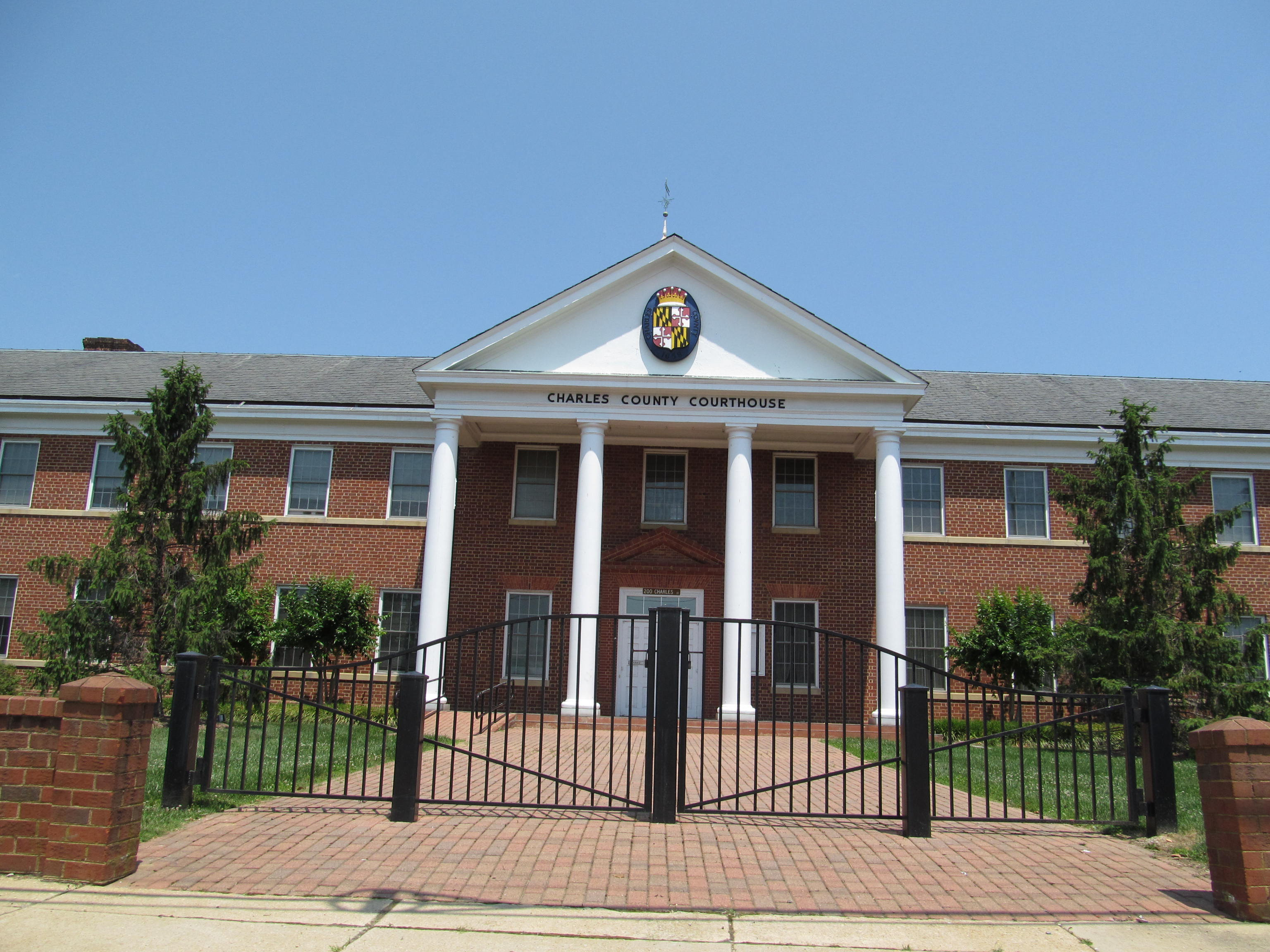
- Charles County Courthouse

- Flag Seal

- Location of La Plata, Maryland

- Location within Maryland Location within the United States
- Coordinates: 38°32′3″N 76°58′24″W
- Country: United States
- State: Maryland
- County: Charles
- Incorporated: 1888
- Founder: Colonel Samuel Chapman
- Named for: Río de la Plata

Area
  - Total: 7.43 sq mi (19.25 km^{2})
  - Land: 7.41 sq mi (19.18 km^{2})
  - Water: 0.027 sq mi (0.07 km^{2})
- Elevation: 190 ft (58 m)

Population (2020)
  - Total: 10,159
  - Estimate (2025): 12,137
  - Density: 1,372.1/sq mi (529.79/km^{2})
- Time zone: UTC-5 (Eastern (EST))
  - Summer (DST): UTC-4 (EDT)
- ZIP code: 20646
- Area codes: 301, 240
- FIPS code: 24-45750
- GNIS feature ID: 0585340
- Website: www.townoflaplata.org

La Plata (/ləˈpleɪtə/ lə-PLAY-tə) is a town in Charles County, Maryland, United States. The population was 10,159 at the 2020 census. It is the county seat of Charles County.

== History ==
According to an unconfirmed local story, the town was named by one Colonel Samuel Chapman, whose family owned 6,000 acres (24 km^{2}) of land in Charles County. The Colonel traveled to South America with his son George, who had contracted tuberculosis, in search of a cure. In his travels, the Colonel had apparently encountered the Río de la Plata, which flows through Argentina and Uruguay, thus naming a portion of his property "La Plata".

In the 1870s, a section of the Pennsylvania Railroad had been constructed through the town of La Plata, leading to its 1888 incorporation.

The La Plata courthouse had been built soon after the 1819 Port Tobacco courthouse caught fire in 1895 under suspicious circumstances. In 1904, the historic Christ Episcopal Church in Port Tobacco, which dates to 1683 and was reconstructed in 1884, was dismantled and its stones were then transported by oxen and cart to its current lot in La Plata.

In 1940, the opening of the then Potomac River Bridge (later, the Governor Harry W. Nice Memorial Bridge), which carries U.S. Route 301 over the Potomac River, provided a link to King George, Virginia and brought long-distance east coast traffic through the town as an alternative to U.S. 1 and, later, Interstate 95. The bridge was replaced and widened in 2021.

=== Tornadoes ===
Despite being well outside the climatologically favored area for significant tornadoes, La Plata has been impacted by several throughout its history. The most recent tornado to strike the town was an EF1 on February 25th, 2017.

1926

On November 9, 1926, an unusual F4 tornado killed 17 people. Fourteen of them were from the La Plata Elementary School, which was totally destroyed. This is also the deadliest tornado in Maryland's history.

1994

On July 27, 1994, the town was struck by two nonfatal tornadoes, occurring just 11 minutes apart. The initial tornado was rated F2 on the Fujita scale, which is already uncommon for the region.

2002

On April 28, 2002, an extremely powerful and fast-moving F4 tornado cut a 78-mile-long (126 km) swath through southeastern Maryland, with areas around La Plata being damaged most severely. This tornado caused five deaths and at least $115 million in damages.

Local officials credited federal- and state-assisted new construction efforts with helping them to remodel the downtown area following the tornado, as several new public buildings replaced some of those damaged there. A new La Plata Town Hall, for example, became Southern Maryland's first LEED-certified building, and an old building considered historic by local residents, which housed a CVS Pharmacy store at the time of the tornado, was rebuilt in a new location after the storm. In the days after the tornado, help was provided by twenty-seven different jurisdictions, as well as the nearby Amish community in St. Mary's County.

== Geography ==
La Plata is located at 38°32′3″N 76°58′24″W (38.534258, -76.973377). On February 24, 2020, The Mayor and Town's Council unanimously adopted the Purple Martin as the official Town bird.

According to the United States Census Bureau, the town has a total area of 7.45 square miles (19.30 km^{2}), of which 7.40 square miles (19.17 km^{2}) is land and 0.05 square miles (0.13 km^{2}) is water.

=== Climate ===
The climate in this area is characterized by hot, humid summers and generally mild to cool winters. According to the Köppen Climate Classification system, La Plata has a humid subtropical climate, abbreviated "Cfa" on climate maps.

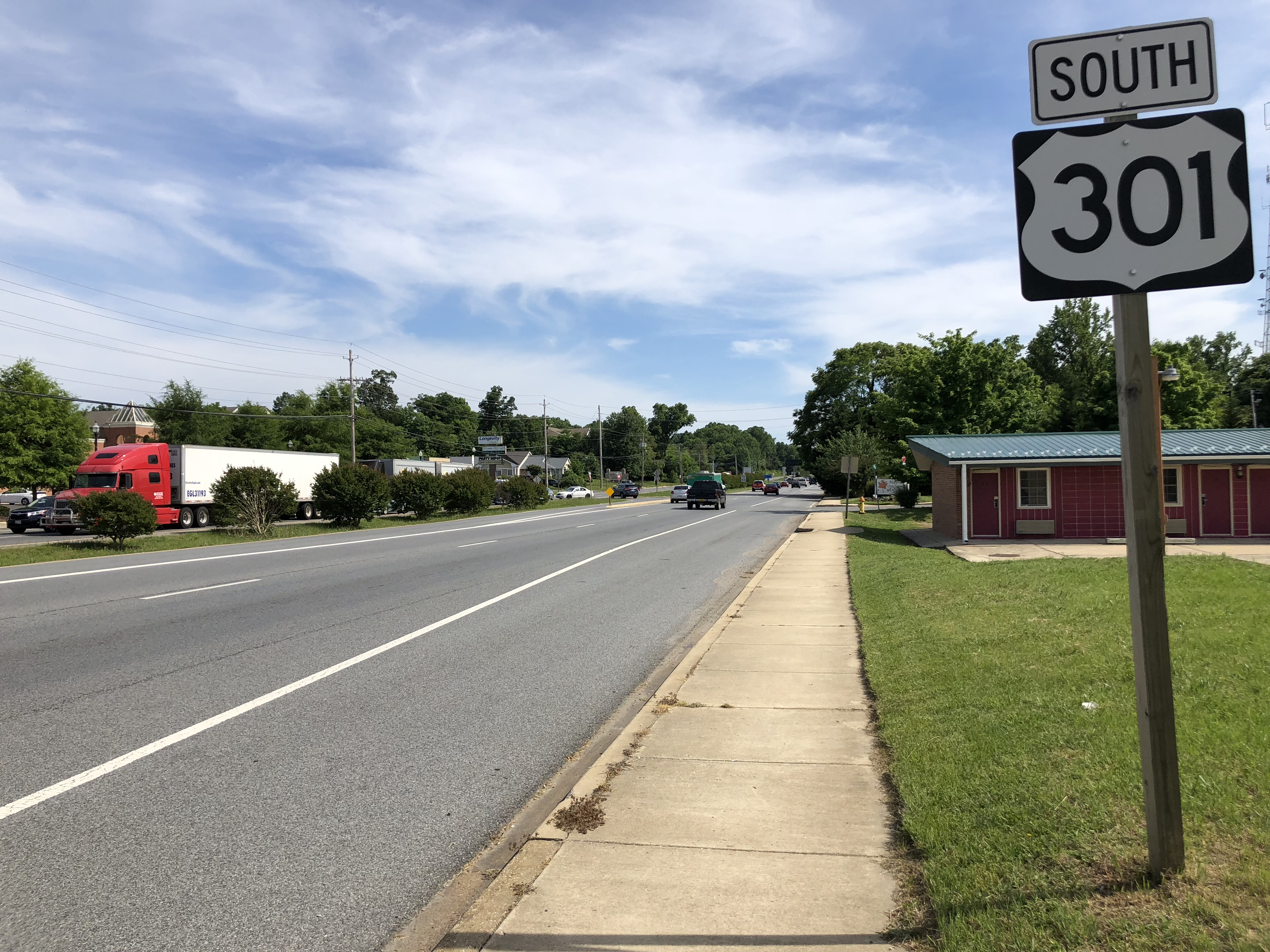
US 301 southbound just south of MD 6 in La Plata

== Transportation ==
The primary method of travel to and from La Plata is by road, and four state highways serve the town. The most significant of these is U.S. Route 301, which follows Crain Highway through the town. From La Plata, US 301 heads south across the Potomac River into Virginia, eventually reaching Richmond. To the north, US 301 passes through Waldorf before intersecting Interstate 495 and U.S. Route 50 near Bowie. From there, US 301 joins I-495 and US 50 east past Annapolis and crosses the Chesapeake Bay Bridge to the Eastern Shore of Maryland. Maryland Route 6 is the main east–west highway serving La Plata, following Port Tobacco Road and Charles Street through town. From La Plata, MD 6 heads west to Port Tobacco and continues east to Charlotte Hall. Maryland Route 225 follows Hawthorne Road westward from US 301 in La Plata, eventually reaching Maryland Route 210 near Indian Head. Finally, Maryland Route 488 follows La Plata Road northeast from MD 6 to Maryland Route 5 near Bryantown.

== Demographics ==
Historical population
| Census | Pop. | Note | %± |
|---|---|---|---|
| 1890 | 116 | | — |
| 1910 | 269 | | — |
| 1920 | 300 | | 11.5% |
| 1930 | 332 | | 10.7% |
| 1940 | 488 | | 47.0% |
| 1950 | 780 | | 59.8% |
| 1960 | 1,214 | | 55.6% |
| 1970 | 1,561 | | 28.6% |
| 1980 | 2,484 | | 59.1% |
| 1990 | 5,841 | | 135.1% |
| 2000 | 6,551 | | 12.2% |
| 2010 | 8,753 | | 33.6% |
| 2020 | 10,159 | | 16.1% |
| 2025 (est.) | 12,137 | | 19.5% |
U.S. Decennial Census

=== 2020 census ===
As of the 2020 census, La Plata had a population of 10,159. The median age was 39.0 years. 24.1% of residents were under the age of 18 and 16.7% of residents were 65 years of age or older. For every 100 females there were 88.1 males, and for every 100 females age 18 and over there were 83.5 males age 18 and over.

96.9% of residents lived in urban areas, while 3.1% lived in rural areas.

There were 3,634 households in La Plata, of which 37.1% had children under the age of 18 living in them. Of all households, 44.8% were married-couple households, 14.9% were households with a male householder and no spouse or partner present, and 34.8% were households with a female householder and no spouse or partner present. About 27.8% of all households were made up of individuals and 12.6% had someone living alone who was 65 years of age or older.

There were 3,778 housing units, of which 3.8% were vacant. The homeowner vacancy rate was 1.5% and the rental vacancy rate was 3.3%.

Racial composition as of the 2020 census
| Race | Number | Percent |
|---|---|---|
| White | 5,384 | 53.0% |
| Black or African American | 3,243 | 31.9% |
| American Indian and Alaska Native | 48 | 0.5% |
| Asian | 413 | 4.1% |
| Native Hawaiian and Other Pacific Islander | 17 | 0.2% |
| Some other race | 187 | 1.8% |
| Two or more races | 867 | 8.5% |
| Hispanic or Latino (of any race) | 571 | 5.6% |

=== Income and poverty ===
The median income for a household in the town was $56,490, and the median income for a family was $66,288. Males had a median income of $42,492 versus $32,125 for females. The per capita income for the town was $24,669. About 8.3% of families and 10.1% of the population were below the poverty line, including 12.0% of those under age 18 and 18.1% of those age 65 or over.

=== 2010 census ===
As of the census of 2010, there were 8,753 people, 3,062 households, and 2,091 families residing in the town. The population density was 1,182.8 inhabitants per square mile (456.7/km^{2}). There were 3,234 housing units at an average density of 437.0 per square mile (168.7/km^{2}). The racial makeup of the town was 66.3% White, 26.7% African American, 0.5% Native American, 2.7% Asian, 0.1% Pacific Islander, 0.7% from other races, and 3.0% from two or more races. Hispanic or Latino of any race were 3.2% of the population.

There were 3,062 households, of which 38.0% had children under the age of 18 living with them, 48.6% were married couples living together, 15.9% had a female householder with no husband present, 3.8% had a male householder with no wife present, and 31.7% were non-families. 26.0% of all households were made up of individuals, and 11.3% had someone living alone who was 65 years of age or older. The average household size was 2.62 and the average family size was 3.17.

The median age in the town was 38.4 years. 24.4% of residents were under the age of 18; 8.9% were between the ages of 18 and 24; 27% were from 25 to 44; 26.4% were from 45 to 64; and 13.4% were 65 years of age or older. The gender makeup of the town was 48.3% male and 51.7% female.

== Attractions ==
La Plata is largely a residential community. Some residents work for the Charles County government, while others commute to Waldorf or the Washington, D.C. and Baltimore areas for work, including to Andrews Air Force Base and Naval Air Station Patuxent River. The town is experiencing a transformation into a thriving business and commercial center, thanks to the development of office buildings and the reconstruction of areas damaged by the 2002 tornado. .The 2020s are seeing a surge in new housing, raising concerns about the adequacy of public services and impacting traffic volume. Mount Carmel Monastery (1790), a Catholic convent, is just outside La Plata, near the main campus of the College of Southern Maryland.

La Plata has county offices, the University of Maryland Charles Regional Medical Center, the main campus of the College of Southern Maryland, a community theater (Port Tobacco Players), a large outdoor athletic complex, two nursing homes, and a host of stores, churches, and restaurants, in addition to a twice-weekly farmers' market. At the north edge of town are Walmart and Target department stores, four supermarkets, a Lowe's home-improvement store, and many other shops. Rosewick Road is connected with St. Charles Parkway to adjacent Waldorf, providing drivers an alternative to using U.S. Route 301.

Public schools in La Plata include La Plata High School, Milton Somers Middle School, Walter Mitchell Elementary, and Mary Matula Elementary. The portion of town west of Route 301 is zoned for James Craik Elementary and Maurice J. McDonough High School. La Plata is within the Charles County Public Schools school district.

There is also the La Plata Train Station Museum.

== Mayors ==
1963–1967 Lowell E. Hawthorne

1967–1973 Raymond T. Tighlman

1973–1983 Victor B. Bowling Jr.

1983–2005 William F. Eckman

2005–2008 Eugene Ambrogio

2008–2017 Roy G. Hale

2017–present Jeannine E. James

== Notable people ==
- Adrian Posey, La Plata benefactor
- Tim Drummond, former Major League Baseball player
- Steve Farr, former Major League Baseball player
- Ryan Hackett, NASCAR driver
- Shane Halter, former Major League Baseball player
- Angela M. Houtz, Department of the Navy analyst and September 11th attacks victim
- Larry Johnson, NFL former football player
- Joel and Benji Madden, founders of pop/punk band Good Charlotte
- Don Money, former Major League Baseball player
- Sydney E. Mudd I and Sydney Emanuel Mudd II, noted politicians
- Buzz Nutter, former NFL football player
- Daryl Thompson, Major League Baseball player
