= Indian Head, Maryland =

Town in Charles County, Maryland, US

- Town
- Flag Seal

- Location of Indian Head, Maryland
- Coordinates: 38°35′52″N 77°9′25″W
- Country: United States of America
- State: Maryland
- County: Charles
- Incorporated: 1920

Government
  - Mayor: Brandon Paulin

Area
  - Total: 1.23 sq mi (3.19 km^{2})
  - Land: 1.23 sq mi (3.19 km^{2})
  - Water: 0 sq mi (0.00 km^{2})
- Elevation: 105 ft (32 m)

Population (2020)
  - Total: 3,894
  - Density: 3,166.3/sq mi (1,222.53/km^{2})
- Time zone: UTC-5 (Eastern (EST))
  - Summer (DST): UTC-4 (EDT)
- ZIP code: 20640
- Area code: 301, 240
- FIPS code: 24-41500
- GNIS feature ID: 0590532
- Website: www.townofindianhead.org

Indian Head is a town in Charles County, Maryland, United States. The population was 3,894 at the 2020 U.S. census. It has been the site of a naval base specializing in gun and rocket propellants since 1890. Production of nitrocellulose and smokeless powder began at the Indian Head Powder Factory in 1900. The name of the base has varied over the years from Indian Head Proving Ground, to Naval Powder Factory, to Naval Propellant Plant, to Naval Ordnance Station, to the present Naval Support Facility Indian Head. The facility's main tenant activity is the Indian Head Naval Surface Warfare Center (NSWC/IH). Advanced research in energetic systems takes place at NSWC/IH. NSWC/IH absorbed the function of the closed Naval Ordnance Laboratory, formerly in White Oak. The base currently employs 3,700 people.

== History ==
The peninsula, a "head" of land overlooking the Potomac River, had been long occupied by various cultures of indigenous peoples. The historic Algonquian-speaking Native American tribe was the Mattawoman (likely a band of the Piscataway) encountered by the first English settlers; the latter called the land "Indian Head", meaning "Indian Peninsula". According to research published by the historical society of Charles County, "Indian Head" is a shortened form of "Indian Headlands". A newspaper article mentions another explanation of the name, that "an unfortunate young brave" from a foreign tribe was beheaded for falling in love with an "Algonquin princess", although Edward W. Rice (the town's mayor at that time) dismissed the story as a "fairy tale".

=== American Civil War ===
During the American Civil War, Union Brigadier General Joseph Hooker commanded the Third Brigade near Budd's Ferry in August 1861. The site was a gathering spot for volunteers, including the 5th New Jersey Volunteer Infantry under Colonel Samuel H. Starr. The site was also used by the Union Army Balloon Corps for reconnaissance of Confederate troop movements across the Potomac.

=== Incorporation ===
The town of Indian Head was incorporated in 1920. It is located between the Potomac River and Mattawoman Creek on Mattawoman/Cornwallis Neck, named for the 1654 grant of 5,000 acres (20 km^{2}) by Cecil Calvert, 2nd Baron Baltimore, to Capt. Thomas Cornwallis of St. Mary's County. This land grant included the 2,000-acre (8.1 km^{2}) Cornwallis Manor on the Potomac, presumably the Indian Head site, with St. Elizabeth's Manor of 2,000 acres (8.1 km^{2}) "nearby but detached". The Town of Indian Head occupies land that was once part of the territory of the Algonquin Indians. The origin of the name Indian Head originates from the term "Indian Headlands", as the entire lower end of the peninsula was occupied by Native Americans and was an Indian Reservation. The name Indian Head first appears in the Census of 1800. In 1850, the Washington Fruit Growers Association purchased a parcel of land, which included Indian Head and "Glymont". Charles Pye offered for sale a parcel of land (664 acres) known as Glymont, On December 2, 1834. The same 664 acres was put up for sale again on July 22, 1843, after the death of Charles Pye. The two tracts of land were purchased by The Glymont Improvement Company and recorded on March 20, 1887. The land (540 acres) was owned by B.D. Tubman and was known as "Glymont". The second tract was called “Cornwallis Neck”, and was sometimes known as “Pye’s Wharf Estate”. It adjoined the lands of S. H. Cox and R. A. Chapman, the first-mentioned tract and others containing 480 acres of land, more or less. Glymont, with Pye's Wharf and Leonard Marbury's Wharf, were the largest river port in Charles County. The name "Indian Head" applies to the land west of Glymont.

During the Second World War, Indian Head thrived, with economic prosperity lasting until the late 1960s. The construction of the planned community of St. Charles, south of Waldorf, brought with it retail chains and big-box stores. This resulted in the downfall of Indian Head businesses as Indian Head residents began spending their income in St. Charles.

Indian Head lacks many basic retail and service businesses. Many remedies for this situation have been attempted, but the desired growth has been slow in coming. Indian Head is bisected by Maryland Route 210, generally known as Indian Head Highway. It goes directly into the middle of town at the entrance to Indian Head Naval Support Facility. Because of this, the town cannot benefit from through-traffic, but must be a destination in its own right.

Private plans to build a massive "Chapman's Landing" housing development a few miles to the north were thwarted in the 1990s when the state government purchased the land to preserve it as green space under its "smart growth" program. The preserved land includes an old growth Shell-Marl Ravine Forest ecosystem.

In 2004, the town opened a "black box" stage theater, the Indian Head Center for the Arts, and is exploring other efforts to revitalize the town. A section of the railroad to the naval facility, built in 1918, was converted to a 13-mile paved hiking/biking trail in 2008. A year-round swimming pool is at the nearby Henry E. Lackey High School. In 2018 the long-abandoned Elys' store was demolished, and a technology education center called the "Velocity Center" completed in 2020, linked to the Naval base (but with opening delayed due to the COVID-19 pandemic).

The indigenous Piscataway Conoy Tribe of Maryland consider the name of the town offensive and have petitioned to have the name changed.

=== Youngest mayor ===
In 2015, Brandon Paulin was elected mayor of Indian Head. Brandon was 19 years of age when he was elected, making him the youngest mayor of any Maryland municipality in state history. As Vice Mayor, Kiran (Ron) Sitoula is the first Nepali to be elected to a public position outside of Nepal and the first non-US-born official in the history of the Town of Indian Head. Brandon was elected on May 5, 2015, and sworn into office on May 12, 2015.

== Geography ==
Indian Head is located at 38°35′52″N 77°9′25″W (38.597781, -77.156926).

According to the United States Census Bureau, the town has a total area of 1.23 square miles (3.19 km^{2}), all land.

== Transportation ==
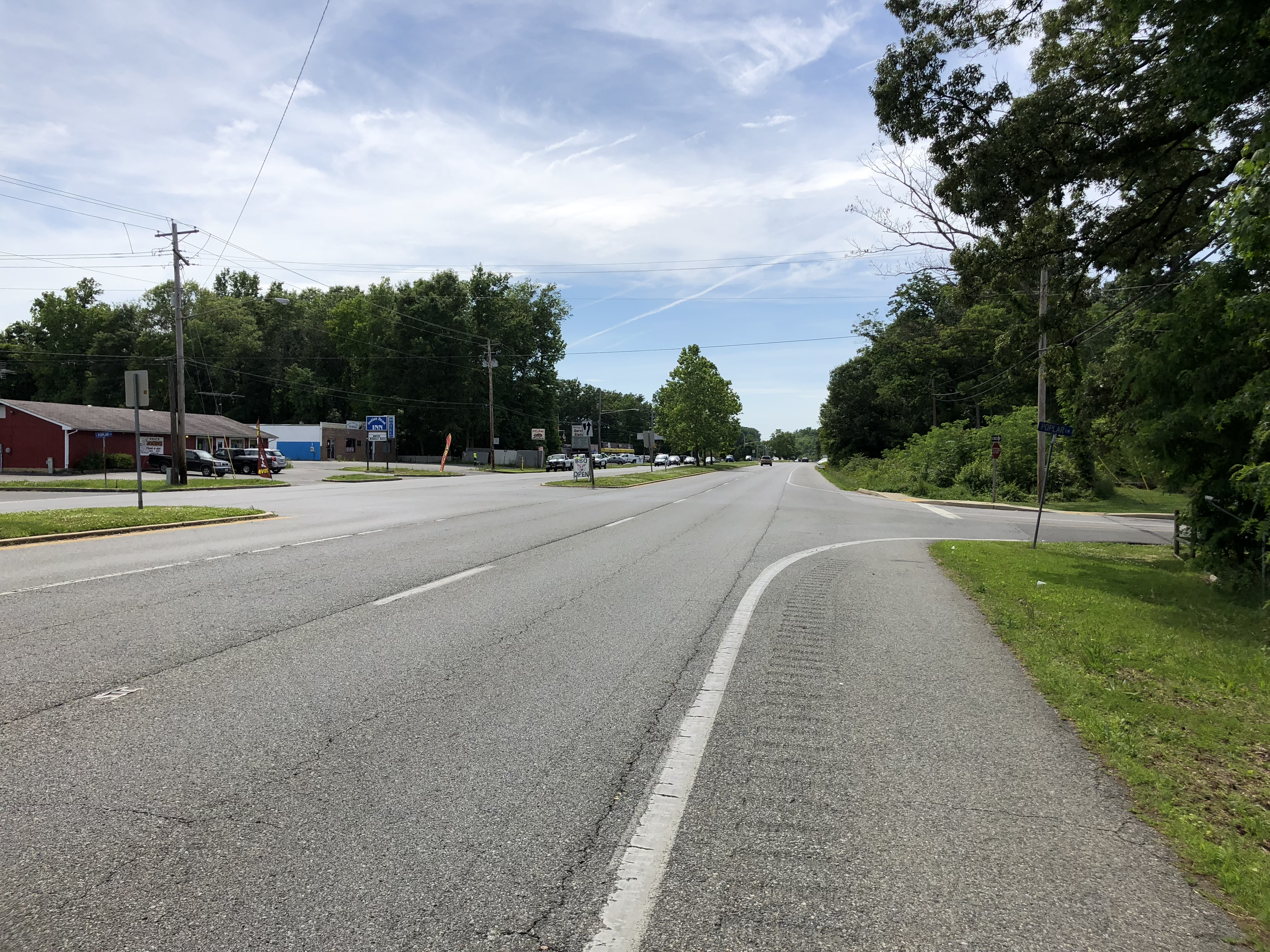
MD 210 southbound in Indian Head

The main method of transportation to and from Indian Head is by road. The only highway serving the town is Maryland Route 210, the aptly named Indian Head Highway, which connects the town to Washington, D.C., and Interstate 95/Interstate 495 (the Capital Beltway).

== Demographics ==
Historical population
Census	Pop.	Note	%±
1930	1,240		—
1940	1,104		−11.0%
1950	491		−55.5%
1960	780		58.9%
1970	1,350		73.1%
1980	1,381		2.3%
1990	3,531		155.7%
2000	3,422		−3.1%
2010	3,844		12.3%
2020	3,894		1.3%
U.S. Decennial Census; 2010 2020

=== Racial and ethnic composition ===
Indian Head town, Maryland – Racial and ethnic composition Note: the US Census treats Hispanic/Latino as an ethnic category. This table excludes Latinos from the racial categories and assigns them to a separate category. Hispanics/Latinos may be of any race.
Race / Ethnicity (NH = Non-Hispanic)	Pop 2010	Pop 2020	% 2010	% 2020
White alone (NH)	1,331	957	34.63%	24.58%
Black or African American alone (NH)	2,117	2,342	55.07%	60.14%
Native American or Alaska Native alone (NH)	41	39	1.07%	1.00%
Asian alone (NH)	100	98	2.60%	2.52%
Pacific Islander alone (NH)	2	0	0.05%	0.00%
Some Other Race alone (NH)	1	10	0.03%	0.26%
Mixed Race or Multi-Racial (NH)	135	240	3.51%	6.16%
Hispanic or Latino (any race)	117	208	3.04%	5.34%
Total	3,844	3,894	100.00%	100.00%

=== 2020 census ===
As of the 2020 census, Indian Head had a population of 3,894. The median age was 35.2 years. 26.6% of residents were under the age of 18 and 9.8% of residents were 65 years of age or older. For every 100 females there were 90.0 males, and for every 100 females age 18 and over there were 85.5 males age 18 and over.

100.0% of residents lived in urban areas, while 0.0% lived in rural areas.

There were 1,446 households in Indian Head, of which 38.5% had children under the age of 18 living in them. Of all households, 33.7% were married-couple households, 18.7% were households with a male householder and no spouse or partner present, and 39.5% were households with a female householder and no spouse or partner present. About 26.1% of all households were made up of individuals and 8.1% had someone living alone who was 65 years of age or older.

There were 1,568 housing units, of which 7.8% were vacant. The homeowner vacancy rate was 2.2% and the rental vacancy rate was 7.1%.

=== 2010 census ===
As of the census of 2010, there were 3,844 people, 1,391 households, and 995 families residing in the town. The population density was 3,125.2 inhabitants per square mile (1,206.6/km^{2}). There were 1,554 housing units at an average density of 1,263.4 per square mile (487.8/km^{2}). The racial makeup of the town was 35.9% White, 55.5% African American, 1.3% Native American, 2.6% Asian, 0.1% Pacific Islander, 0.8% from other races, and 3.8% from two or more races. Hispanic or Latino of any race were 3.0% of the population.

There were 1,391 households, of which 44.0% had children under the age of 18 living with them, 40.6% were married couples living together, 25.6% had a female householder with no husband present, 5.3% had a male householder with no wife present, and 28.5% were non-families. 22.6% of all households were made up of individuals, and 3.7% had someone living alone who was 65 years of age or older. The average household size was 2.76 and the average family size was 3.24.

The median age in the town was 33.2 years. 28.2% of residents were under the age of 18; 10.5% were between the ages of 18 and 24; 30.4% were from 25 to 44; 23.6% were from 45 to 64; and 7.4% were 65 years of age or older. The gender makeup of the town was 47.3% male and 52.7% female.

=== 2000 census ===
As of the census of 2000, there were 3,422 people, 1,222 households, and 888 families residing in the town. The population density was 2,792.7 inhabitants per square mile (1,078.3/km^{2}). There were 1,311 housing units at an average density of 1,069.9 per square mile (413.1/km^{2}). The racial makeup of the town was 55.64% White, 38.08% African American, 1.78% Native American, 1.43% Asian, 0.03% Pacific Islander, 0.47% from other races, and 2.57% from two or more races. Hispanic or Latino of any race were 1.69% of the population.

There were 1,222 households, out of which 44.3% had children under the age of 18 living with them, 43.5% were married couples living together, 22.9% had a female householder with no husband present, and 27.3% were non-families. 21.1% of all households were made up of individuals, and 5.8% had someone living alone who was 65 years of age or older. The average household size was 2.80 and the average family size was 3.26.

In the town, the age distribution of the population shows 33.0% under the age of 18, 8.4% from 18 to 24, 34.3% from 25 to 44, 16.7% from 45 to 64, and 7.6% who were 65 years of age or older. The median age was 31 years. For every 100 females, there were 94.3 males. For every 100 females age 18 and over, there were 87.0 males.

The median income for a household in the town was $42,702, and the median income for a family was $48,375. Males had a median income of $35,625 versus $31,451 for females. The per capita income for the town was $18,778. About 9.9% of families and 11.5% of the population were below the poverty line, including 13.9% of those under age 18 and 11.8% of those age 65 or over.

== Notable people ==
- Madison Scott, WNBA player
