= Maryland Route 227 =

State highway in Maryland, United States

Maryland Route 227
- Map of Southern Maryland with MD 227 highlighted in red

Route information
- Maintained by MDSHA
- Length: 13.96 mi (22.47 km)
- Existed: 1927–present

Major junctions
- West end: Road end at Marshall Hall
- MD 210 in Bryans Road; MD 224 in Pomonkey; MD 229 near Pomfret
- East end: US 301 in White Plains

Location
- Country: United States
- State: Maryland
- Counties: Charles

Highway system
- Maryland highway system; Interstate; US; State; Scenic Byways
← MD 225	→ MD 228

Maryland Route 227 (MD 227) is a state highway in the U.S. state of Maryland. The state highway runs 13.96 miles (22.47 km) from Marshall Hall east to U.S. Route 301 (US 301) in White Plains. MD 227 connects the communities of Bryans Road, Pomonkey, and Pomfret in northwestern Charles County. The state highway, which was constructed in the mid-1920s and early 1930s, originally had its western terminus at Pomonkey; the remainder of the current route was part of MD 224 and all of MD 226. MD 227 gained its present western terminus in the mid-1950s.

== Route description ==
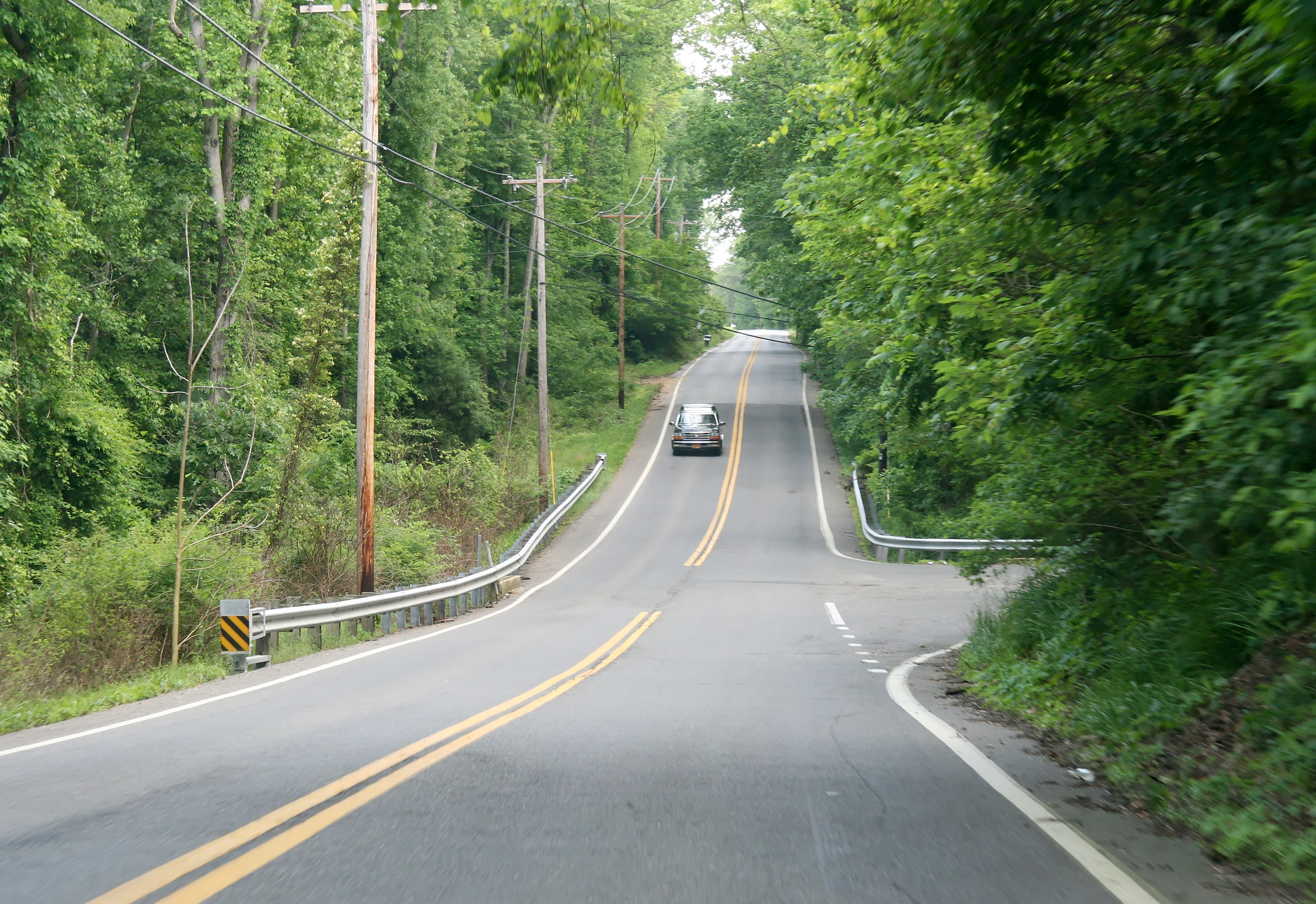
MD 227 eastbound at intersection with Brierwood Road near Pomfret

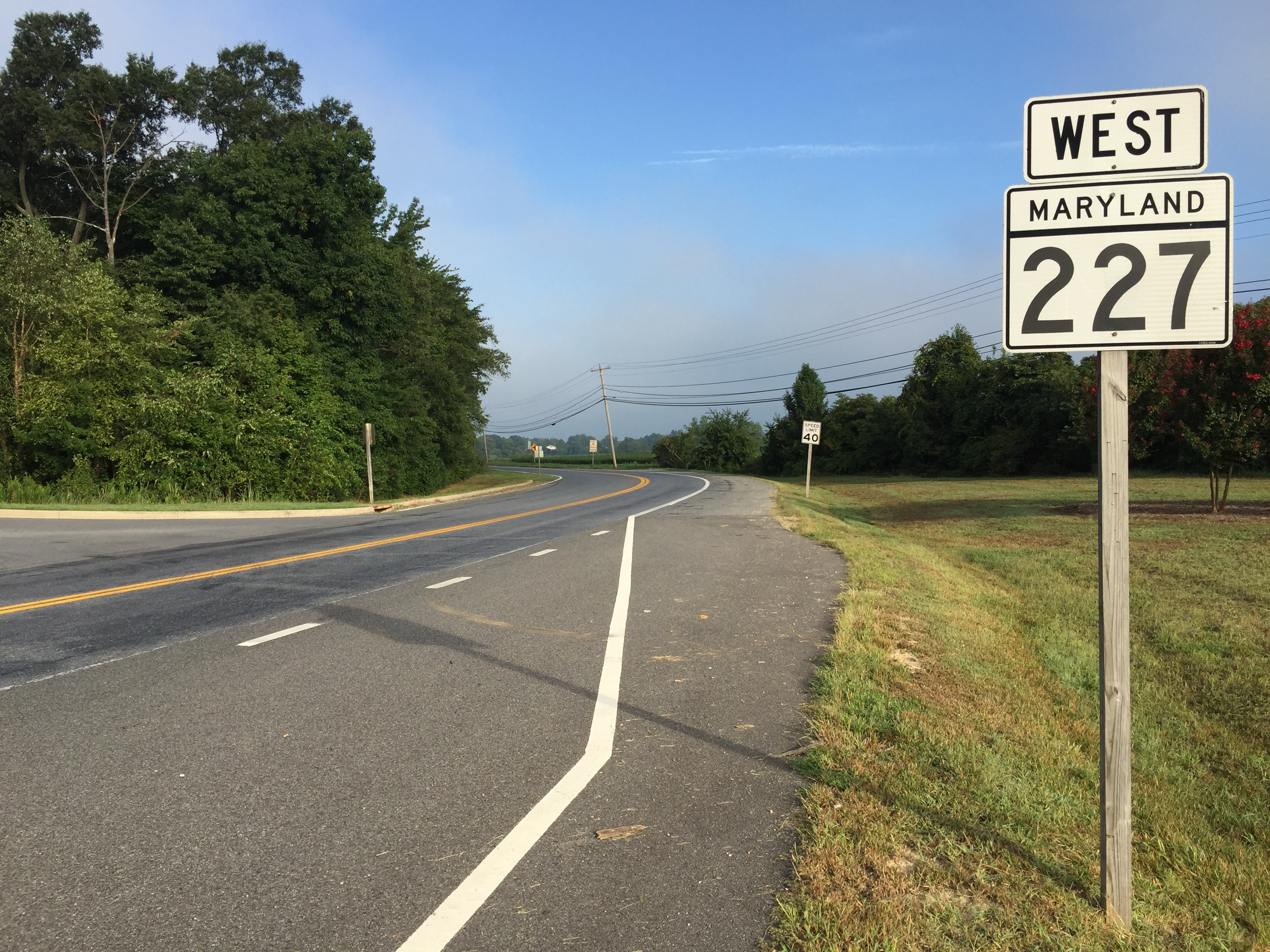
View west along MD 227 at US 301 in White Plains

MD 227 begins at a boat ramp on the Potomac River adjacent to the ruins of the namesake mansion at Marshall Hall within Piscataway Park. The state highway heads south as Marshall Hall Road, a two-lane undivided road through a forested area. MD 227 crosses Mill Swamp and begins to pass residential subdivisions as the highway approaches the community of Bryans Road, where the highway intersects MD 210 (Indian Head Highway). The state highway heads south as Livingston Road to Pomonkey, where MD 224 continues southwest as Livingston Road toward Mason Springs while MD 227 veers southeast as Pomfret Road. The state highway crosses Mattawoman Creek, passes west of the historic farm McPherson's Purchase, and intersects the Indian Head Rail Trail on its way to Pomfret, where the highway meets Marshall Corner Road. MD 227 turns north onto Marshall Corner Road, curving to the east and passing the entrance to Green's Inheritance before meeting the southern end of MD 229 (Bensville Road). East of Pomfret, the state highway passes close to another pair of historic homes, Pleasant Hill and Oak Grove, the latter of which is on the intersecting Turkey Hill Road. MD 227 crosses Pages Swamp and passes close to another historic home, Spye Park, before reaching White Plains, where the state highway reaches its eastern terminus at US 301 (Robert Crain Highway) opposite county-maintained Willetts Crossing Road.

== History ==
Maryland Route 226
- Location: Bryans Road–Marshall Hall
- Existed: 1927–1956

Present-day MD 227 was built as part of three different state highways. Livingston Road between Bryans Road and Pomonkey was constructed around 1923 as part of MD 224, which originally ran from MD 6 at Doncaster to the District of Columbia border in Forest Heights. Marshall Hall Road was built as MD 226 between 1924 and 1927. MD 227's portion of Marshall Corner Road was constructed between 1924 and 1926. The final portion of MD 227, Pomfret Road, was started in 1929 and complete from Marshall Corner Road to the bridge over Mattawoman Creek in 1930. The gap between Mattawoman Creek and Livingston Road was filled by 1933. MD 227 was extended north over Livingston Road and Marshall Hall Road to its present western terminus, taking over all of MD 226's course, in 1956.

== Junction list ==
The entire route is in Charles County.

Location	mi	km	Destinations	Notes
Marshall Hall	0.00	0.00	Road end at Potomac River	Western terminus
Bryans Road	4.51	7.26	MD 210 (Indian Head Highway) – Indian Head, Washington	
Pomonkey	5.84	9.40	MD 224 south (Livingston Road) – Mason Springs	Northern terminus of MD 224
Pomfret	10.16	16.35	MD 229 north (Bensville Road) – Bennsville	Southern terminus of MD 229
White Plains	13.96	22.47	US 301 (Robert Crain Highway) / Willetts Crossing Road south – Waldorf, La Plata	Eastern terminus
1.000 mi = 1.609 km; 1.000 km = 0.621 mi
