= Maryland Route 229 =

State highway in Maryland, United States

Maryland Route 229
- Bensville Road
- Map of Southern Maryland with MD 229 highlighted in red

Route information
- Maintained by MDSHA
- Length: 5.25 mi (8.45 km)
- Existed: 1997–present

Major junctions
- South end: MD 227 near Pomfret
- North end: MD 228 near Bennsville

Location
- Country: United States
- State: Maryland
- Counties: Charles

Highway system
- Maryland highway system; Interstate; US; State; Scenic Byways
← MD 228	→ MD 231

Maryland Route 229 (MD 229) is a state highway in the U.S. state of Maryland. Known as Bensville Road, the state highway runs 5.25 miles (8.45 km) from MD 227 near Pomfret north to MD 228 near Bennsville. MD 229 passes through the community of Bennsville in northern Charles County. The state highway was originally constructed as part of MD 228 in the late 1920s. When MD 228 was extended west to Accokeek in the mid 1990s, MD 229 was assigned to Bensville Road.

== Route description ==
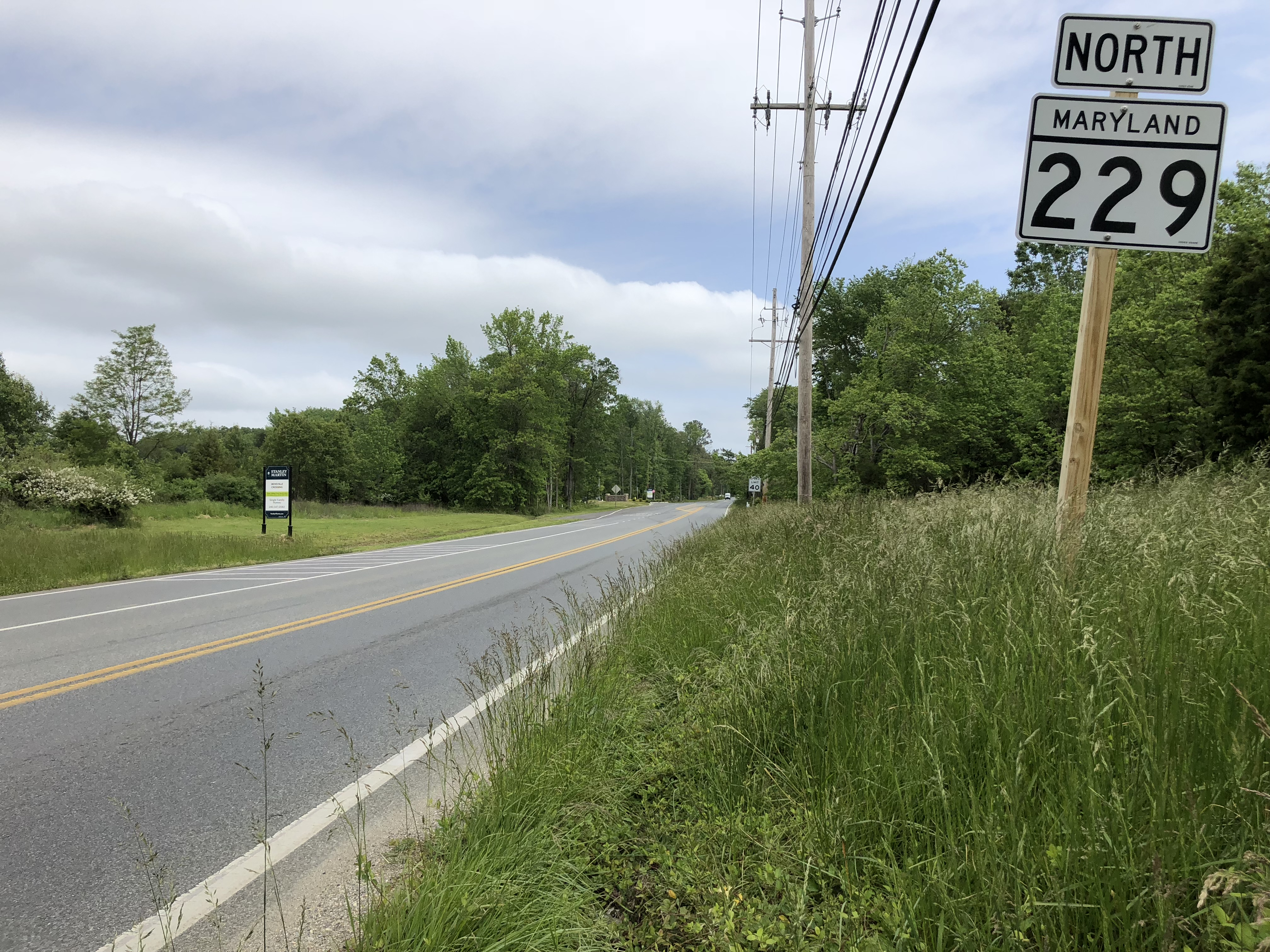
View north along MD 229 at Billingsley Road in Bennsville

MD 229 begins at an intersection with MD 227 (Marshall Corner Road) near Pomfret. The state highway heads north as a two-lane undivided road through a forested area, intersecting the Indian Head Rail Trail and crossing over Old Womans Run before passing east of Bensville Park. MD 229 continues through scattered residential subdivisions in the community of Bennsville, where the highway intersects Billingsley Road, a major east–west county highway connecting Bryans Road with St. Charles. The state highway veers northeast, paralleling Mattawoman Creek to its northern terminus at MD 228 (Berry Road) just south of the Prince George's County line.

== History ==
Bensville Road is the second highway to be designated MD 229. MD 229 was originally assigned to Morgantown Road between Morgantown and MD 3 (now MD 257) in Wayside in southern Charles County. Morgantown Road was constructed as a modern highway by 1921. MD 229 served as the connection to a Potomac River ferry that operated between Morgantown and Colonial Beach, Virginia, from 1933 to at least the early 1940s. Morgantown Road was removed from the state highway system in 1956.

Bensville Road was originally part of MD 228. The highway was constructed as a 15-foot (4.6 m) gravel road from Pomfret to Bennsville in 1925 and 1926. The remainder of Bensville Road was built in 1927. The MD 228 designation was removed from Bensville Road after that highway was extended to Accokeek in southwestern Prince George's County in 1995. MD 229 was assigned to Bensville Road by 1997.

== Junction list ==
The entire route is in Charles County.

Location	mi	km	Destinations	Notes
Pomfret	0.00	0.00	MD 227 (Marshall Corner Road) – Pomonkey, White Plains	Southern terminus
Bennsville	5.25	8.45	MD 228 (Berry Road) – Waldorf, Accokeek	Northern terminus
1.000 mi = 1.609 km; 1.000 km = 0.621 mi
