= Maryland Route 228 =

Highway in Maryland

Maryland Route 228
- Berry Road
- Map of Southern Maryland with MD 228 highlighted in red

Route information
- Maintained by MDSHA
- Length: 6.88 mi (11.07 km)
- Existed: 1927–present

Major junctions
- West end: MD 210 in Accokeek
- MD 229 near Bennsville
- East end: US 301 / MD 5 Bus. in Waldorf

Location
- Country: United States
- State: Maryland
- Counties: Prince George's, Charles

Highway system
- Maryland highway system; Interstate; US; State; Scenic Byways
← MD 227	→ MD 229

Maryland Route 228 (MD 228) is a state highway in the U.S. state of Maryland. Known as Berry Road, the state highway runs 6.88 miles (11.07 km) from MD 210 in Accokeek east to U.S. Route 301 (US 301) and MD 5 Business in Waldorf. MD 228, which is a four-lane divided highway for its entire length, is a major commuter route between southwestern Prince George's County and northern Charles County. In conjunction with MD 210, the state highway serves as an alternative to US 301 and MD 5 as a route to Washington, D.C. from Southern Maryland. MD 228 also serves as part of the connection, again via MD 210, between Waldorf and Indian Head Naval Surface Warfare Center.

MD 228 did not originally connect Waldorf with Accokeek; instead, the state highway headed west from Waldorf and turned south near the Prince George's – Charles county line, following what is now MD 229 to Pomfret. The state highway was built from Pomfret to Berry in the late 1920s. MD 228 was completed between Berry and Waldorf in the mid-1930s. MD 228 was expanded to a divided highway in Charles County and extended into Prince George's County in the mid-1990s. In 2000, the Prince George's County section of the state highway was reconstructed as a divided highway west to the MD 210 intersection, which was rebuilt as the second continuous-flow intersection in the U.S.

== Route description ==
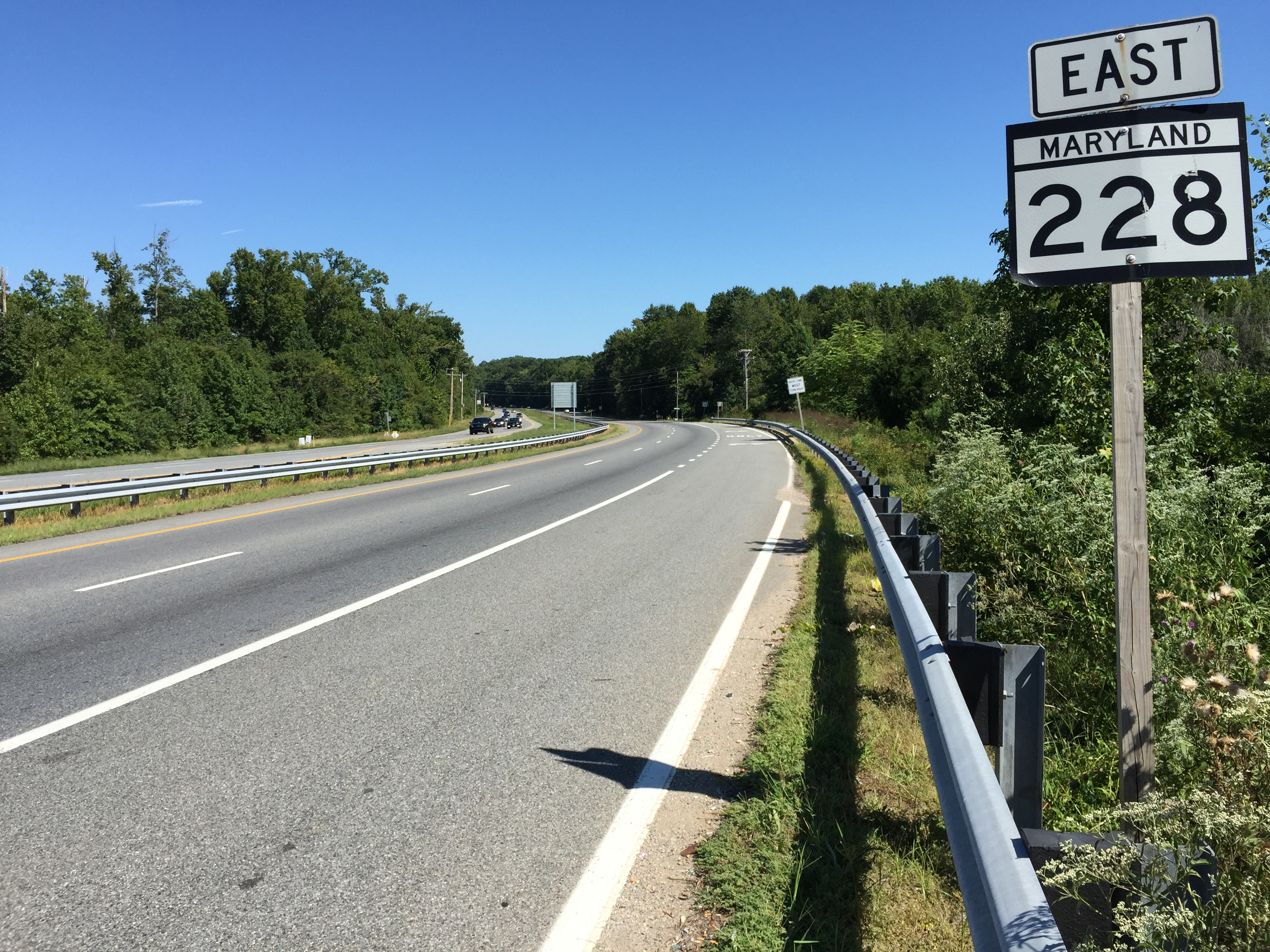
View east along MD 228 near MD 229 near Bennsville

MD 228 begins at a continuous-flow intersection with MD 210 (Indian Head Highway) in Accokeek. Three lanes leave southbound MD 210 and intersect northbound MD 210. A short distance to the southeast, those lanes intersect a single lane from westbound MD 228 to southbound MD 210; that lane intersects northbound MD 210 to the northwest. The two lanes from westbound MD 228 seamlessly join northbound MD 210, while a single lane ramp from northbound MD 210 joins eastbound MD 228. The auxiliary lanes from the continuous-flow intersection merge into the state highway's four-lane divided profile before intersecting Manning Road East (unsigned MD 810I), which serves a shopping center to the west and the historic home Bellevue to the east.

MD 228 heads east through a forested area, intersecting Bealle Hill Road (unsigned MD 228A) immediately before crossing over Mattawoman Creek into Charles County. On the east side of the stream crossing, the state highway intersects the northern terminus of MD 229 (Bensville Road), the old alignment of MD 228. MD 228 continues east between residential subdivisions along the northern tier of Charles County. The state highway crosses Piney Branch, a tributary of Mattawoman Creek, and passes the highway's old alignment of Bunker Hill Road to the south in the hamlet of Berry. MD 228 curves to the southeast after passing Ironwood Drive and enters Waldorf. At Western Parkway, a county-maintained suburban boulevard that parallels US 301 to the west through Waldorf, MD 228 gains continuous right-turn lanes in both directions and enters a commercial area. The state highway reaches its eastern terminus at US 301 (Robert Crain Highway). The roadway continues on the east side of the intersection as MD 5 Business (Leonardtown Road), which heads southeast through the center of Waldorf before intersecting MD 5 on the east side of town.

MD 228 is a part of the main National Highway System for its entire length.

== History ==
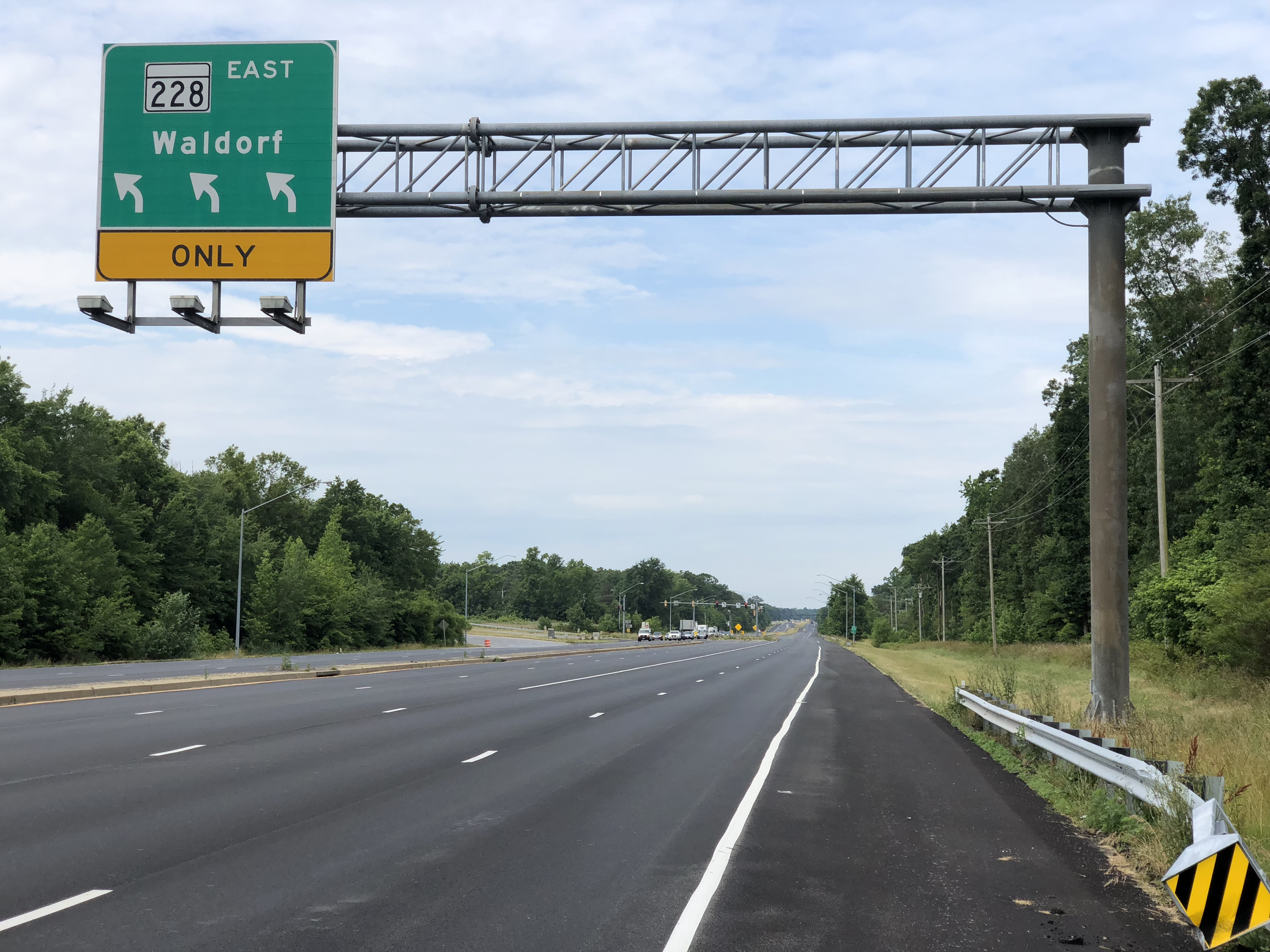
Southbound MD 210 at its continuous-flow intersection with MD 228 in Accokeek

MD 228 originally included Bensville Road and Berry Road east of the highway's modern intersection with MD 229. The two named roads met at a defunct intersection with Bealle Hill Road south of Mattawoman Creek. A 15-foot (4.6 m) wide gravel road was constructed from MD 227 in Pomfret to Bennsville in 1925 and 1926. The highway was extended to the crossing of Piney Branch in 1927 and to Berry in 1928. MD 228 was constructed west from MD 3 (later US 301 and now MD 925) to Hamilton Road (now Western Parkway) in 1933. The state highway was completed in 1936 when the gap between Berry and Hamilton Road was filled. The Berry Road portion of MD 228 was reconstructed in 1958 and 1959, leaving behind Bunker Hill Road as an old alignment.

The reconstruction of MD 228 in its modern form and course began in the early 1990s. The state highway was expanded to a divided highway from US 301 west to Sharpersville Road in Berry in 1993. MD 228 was extended into Prince George's County on a pair of new bridges over Mattawoman Creek in 1995. The divided highway extended to just west of a new intersection with Bealle Hill Road; the state highway continued west as a two-lane road to a standard intersection with MD 210. Bennsville Road was renumbered as MD 229 by 1997. The MD 228 divided highway was extended west to MD 210 and the MD 228–MD 210 junction was reconstructed as a continuous-flow intersection in 2000. That intersection became the second continuous-flow intersection in the U.S.

== Junction list ==
County	Location	mi	km	Destinations	Notes
Prince George's	Accokeek	0.00	0.00	MD 210 (Indian Head Highway) – Indian Head, Washington	Continuous flow intersection; western terminus
Prince George's	Accokeek	0.54	0.87	Manning Road East	Unsigned MD 810I
Prince George's	Accokeek	1.30	2.09	Bealle Hill Road north	Unsigned MD 228A
Charles	Bennsville	1.54	2.48	MD 229 south (Bensville Road) to MD 227 – Pomfret	Northern terminus of MD 229; old alignment of MD 228
Charles	Waldorf	6.88	11.07	US 301 (Robert Crain Highway) / MD 5 Bus. south (Leonardtown Road) – La Plata, Baltimore, Leonardtown	Eastern terminus; northern terminus of MD 5 Bus.
1.000 mi = 1.609 km; 1.000 km = 0.621 mi

== Auxiliary route ==
MD 228A is the designation for a 0.16-mile (0.26 km) section of two-lane undivided Bealle Hill Road immediately to the north of the highway's intersection with MD 228 just west of Mattawoman Creek in Accokeek.
