= Maryland Route 210 =

Highway in Maryland

Maryland Route 210
- Indian Head Highway
- Maryland Route 210 highlighted in red

Route information
- Maintained by MDSHA
- Length: 20.86 mi (33.57 km)
- Existed: 1949–present

Major junctions
- South end: Potomac Avenue in Indian Head
- MD 225 in Potomac Heights; MD 227 in Bryans Road; MD 228 in Accokeek; MD 373 in Accokeek; I-95 / I-295 / I-495 in Forest Heights; MD 414 in Forest Heights
- North end: South Capitol Street at the District of Columbia boundary in Glassmanor

Location
- Country: United States
- State: Maryland
- Counties: Charles, Prince George's

Highway system
- Maryland highway system; Interstate; US; State; Scenic Byways
| ← MD 208 | → MD 212 |

Maryland Route 210 (MD 210) is a state highway in the U.S. state of Maryland. Known as Indian Head Highway, the highway runs 20.86 miles (33.57 km) from Potomac Avenue in Indian Head north to the District of Columbia boundary in Forest Heights, where the highway continues into Washington, D.C., as South Capitol Street. MD 210 is a four- to six-lane divided highway that connects Washington, D.C., with the suburban communities of Oxon Hill, Fort Washington, and Accokeek in southwestern Prince George's County, and Bryans Road and Indian Head in northwestern Charles County. The highway also provides access to Fort Washington Park and Indian Head Naval Surface Warfare Center and, in conjunction with MD 228, connects Waldorf with Interstate 95 (I-95)/I-495 and I-295.

Indian Head Highway was constructed by the U.S. federal government as a military access highway in the mid-1940s to connect Washington with the Indian Head Naval Proving Ground and Fort Washington. The previous highway between Washington, D.C., and Indian Head was Livingston Road, which was traced in the late 18th century and improved in the 1920s and early 1930s as MD 224. The new highway incorporated several sections of meandering MD 224 into its straight path. Indian Head Highway was fully designated MD 210 in the mid-1950s when the road was transferred from federal to state control. MD 210 was expanded to a divided highway in Forest Heights in the late 1940s and south through Fort Washington in the 1960s. Another section of divided highway was completed through Charles County in the late 1960s and early 1970s. The final divided highway section was completed through Accokeek in the mid-1980s. MD 210 was connected with I-295 in 1989 and its interchange with I-95/I-495 was reconstructed in the mid-2000s. The Maryland State Highway Administration has long-term plans to replace the highway's major intersections with interchanges from Oxon Hill south through Fort Washington.

== Route description ==
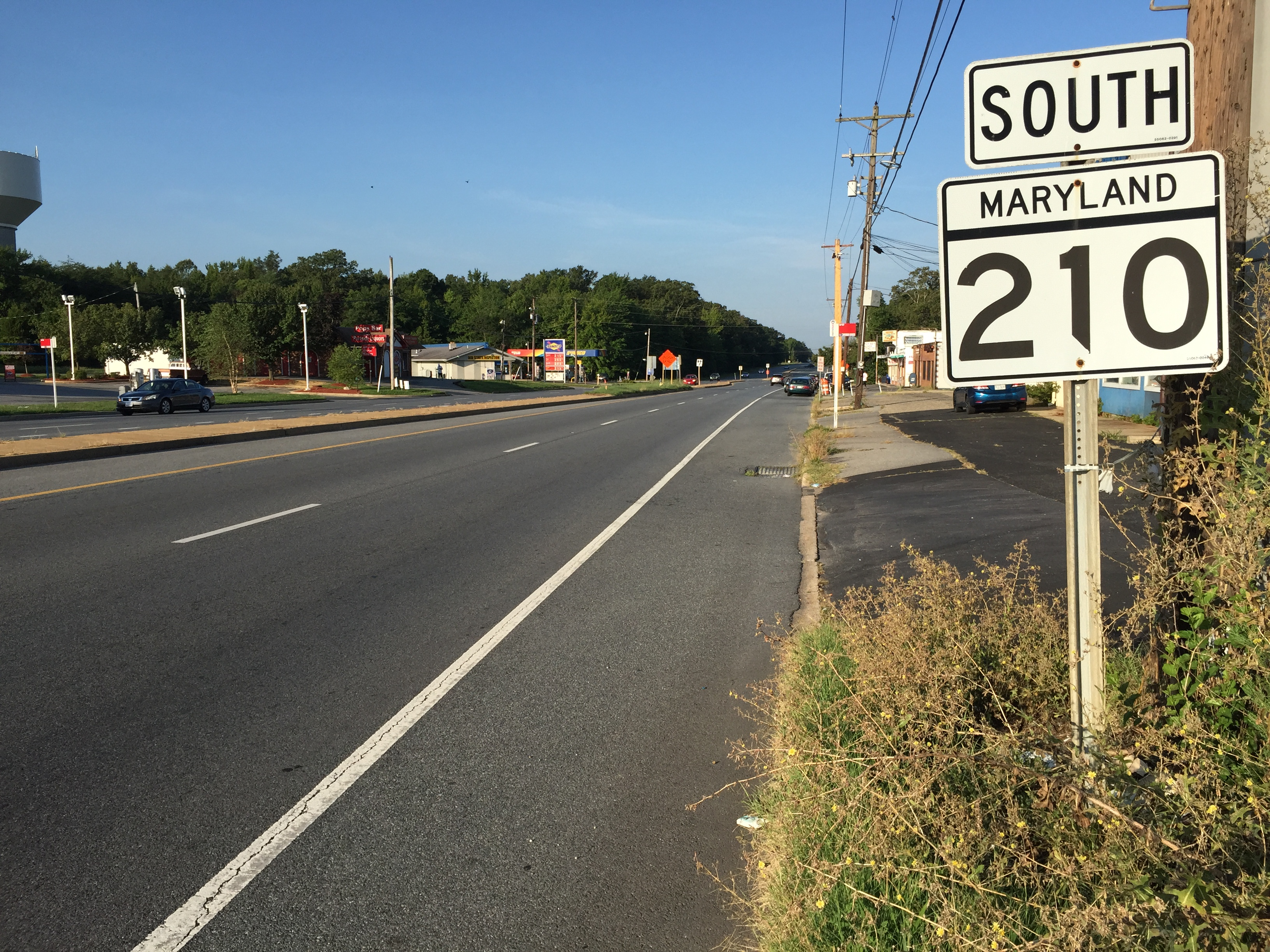
View south along MD 210 at MD 227 in Bryans Road

MD 210 begins at an intersection with Potomac Avenue in the town of Indian Head. Indian Head Highway continues west as a municipally maintained boulevard west to the entrance of the Indian Head Naval Surface Warfare Center at the west end of town. MD 210 heads east as a four-lane divided highway through the eastern part of town parallel to Strauss Avenue, which splits southeast just east of Potomac Avenue. The state highway leaves the town and enters Potomac Heights, where it meets the western end of MD 225 (Hawthorne Road). MD 210 leaves the populated area and passes to the south of Chapman State Park, which contains the historic farm complex Mount Aventine. The highway reenters a suburban area in the community of Bryans Road, where the highway intersects MD 227; MD 227 heads north as Marshall Hall Road and south as Livingston Road. East of MD 227, MD 210 is paralleled by frontage roads intermittently to its northern terminus.

MD 210 enters Prince George's County and Livingston Road splits to the north and the state highway enters Accokeek. Southwest of MD 228 at Pine Drive, which is unsigned MD 810G, eight spectators of an illegal street drag race were killed in the early morning hours of February 16, 2008, by a vehicle not involved in the drag race while standing in the middle of the northbound carriageway of MD 210. MD 210 expands to six lanes and its traffic volume doubles beyond its continuous-flow intersection with MD 228 (Berry Road). The highway intersects Livingston Road again in the center of Accokeek; that highway heads east as MD 373 and west as MD 810J before becoming a county highway. MD 210 intersects Farmington Road and curves north to cross Piscataway Creek. The state highway continues along the eastern edge of Fort Washington, where it intersects Old Fort Road and Swan Creek Road; the latter provides access to Livingston Road, which switches to the west side of the state highway. MD 210 intersects Fort Washington Road, which leads to Fort Washington Park, and Old Fort Road again east of historic Harmony Hall and St. John's Church, which are accessed from Livingston Road. Livingston Road reconnects with MD 210 at Palmer Road, north of which the state highway crosses Henson Creek.

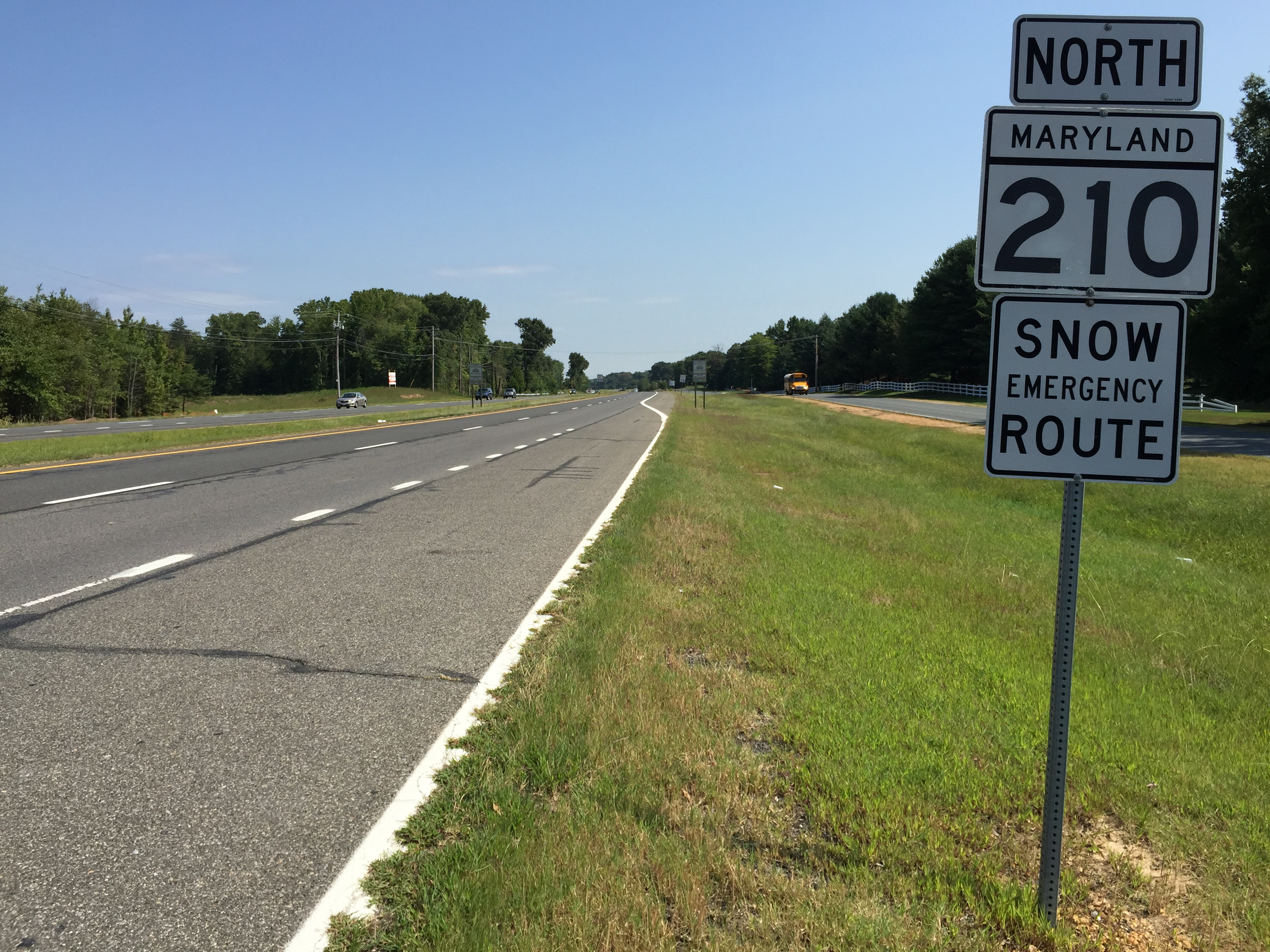
MD 210 northbound in Accokeek

MD 210 crosses Carey Branch and has a ramp allowing access to Kerby Hill Road and Livingston Road; the latter splits northeast toward Oxon Hill. North of Wilson Bridge Drive, MD 210 expands to eight lanes and meets the southern end of two-lane ramps from northbound MD 210 to I-295 (Anacostia Freeway) and from I-295 to southbound MD 210. The ramp to southbound MD 210 also receives traffic from northbound I-95/I-495 (Capital Beltway) just east of the Woodrow Wilson Bridge, and the ramp from northbound MD 210 also provides access to the northbound Beltway and the southbound express lanes of the Beltway, which bypass the exits for I-295 and U.S. Route 1 and Virginia State Route 241 in Alexandria. North of those ramps, MD 210 continues as a four-lane divided highway and has a partial cloverleaf interchange with MD 414 (Oxon Hill Road), which provides access to the Oxon Hill Farm and National Harbor; access from the northbound direction of the Beltway to northbound MD 210 is via MD 414.

MD 210 becomes six lanes again, crosses the eight-lane Beltway, and completes the Beltway access with several ramps connecting with the local lanes of the southbound Beltway. MD 210 continues north as a four-lane divided highway through the town of Forest Heights; the frontage road on the southbound side of the highway is Sachem Drive. At the north end of the residential town, the state highway meets the northern end of the northernmost Maryland segment of Livingston Road. Southbound MD 210 gains a third lane and the highway continues through a commercial area. The state highway becomes undivided just south of its terminus at the District of Columbia boundary at Southern Avenue. The highway continues north as South Capitol Street through Bellevue and Anacostia. Just north of the intersection, the Washington, D.C., segment of Livingston Road splits to the north, ending at Atlantic Street.

MD 210 is a part of the main National Highway System from MD 228 in Accokeek to I-95, I-295, and I-495 in Forest Heights.

== History ==
The main highway along the Washington–Indian Head corridor before the construction of Indian Head Highway was Livingston Road, which follows much of the course of a road that has connected Charles County and the District of Columbia parallel to the eastern shore of the Potomac River through Prince George's County since the late 18th century. The road became more important as the highway connecting Washington, D.C., with both Fort Washington and Fort Foote and later the Indian Head Naval Proving Ground, a gunpowder factory and testing area started by the U.S. Navy in the late 19th century. At its southern end at Mason Springs, Livingston Road was connected to Indian Head by the La Plata–Indian Head road that later became MD 225. At the District of Columbia boundary in what is now Forest Heights, Livingston Road continued north to Atlantic Street, which connected with Nichols Avenue (now Martin Luther King Jr. Avenue), which headed north to a crossing of the Anacostia River at the site of the 11th Street Bridges.

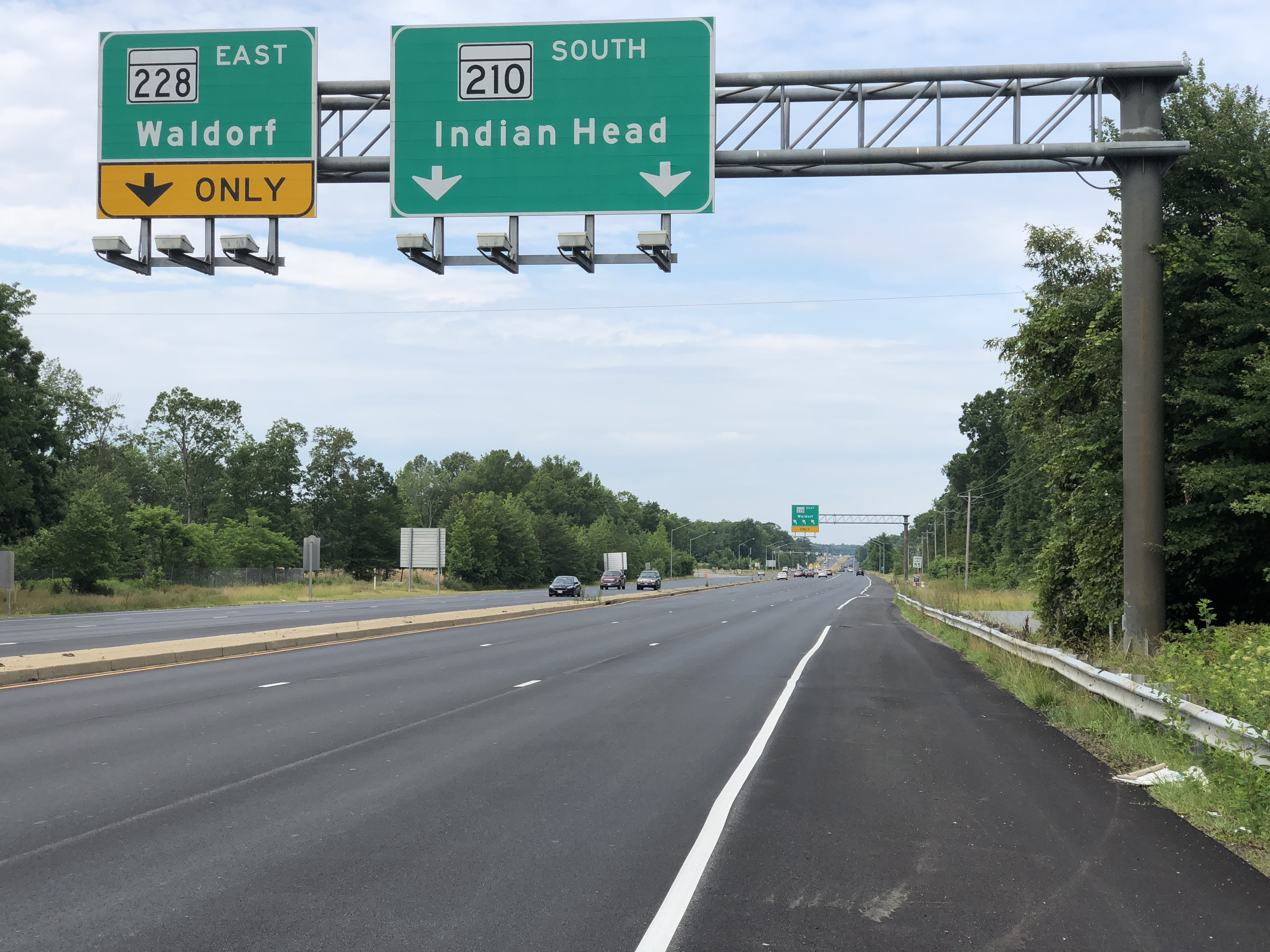
MD 210 southbound at its continuous-flow intersection with MD 228 in Accokeek

The first segment of Livingston Road in Maryland to be paved as a modern highway was from the District of Columbia boundary south to Oxon Hill Road in Forest Heights, which was paved by Prince George's County with state aid as a macadam road by 1910. A part of this piece of highway later became the northernmost part of Indian Head Highway. Construction of Livingston Road as a modern highway was completed in 1933, when the highway became part of MD 224. Other segments of Livingston Road that were reconstructed as part of Indian Head Highway were from Kerby Hill Road south to Palmer Road and from the Charles–Prince George's county line west to Bryans Road, which were both constructed as gravel roads in 1923. The westernmost portion of Indian Head Highway in the town of Indian Head was a reconstruction of Strauss Avenue, a part of which remains as a street that splits off and parallels MD 210 through the eastern part of the town. By 1934, MD 224 was proposed to be widened from 16 to 20 feet (4.9 to 6.1 m) from Oxon Hill to Piscataway. The need for upgrades to Livingston Road became acute by 1940 with the greatly increased activity at Fort Washington and the Indian Head Naval Powder Factory in the years before the United States entered World War II.

Indian Head Highway was constructed as a highway on a new alignment in several segments during World War II. Two portions of the highway in Charles County were built by 1944: from the Strauss Avenue split east to approximately the MD 225 intersection, and from the western intersection with Chapman Landing Road to Matthews Road just east of the MD 227 intersection at Bryans Road. No portion of Indian Head Highway was constructed between Bryans Road and Henson Creek by 1944. A section of the highway was built between MD 224 at Kerby Hill Road south of Oxon Hill and MD 224 north of Oxon Hill in 1945. All of Indian Head Highway from Indian Head to Washington was complete by 1946. MD 210 was assigned to the Indian Head–Bryans Road portion of Indian Head Highway by 1949. The designation was applied to the remainder of the highway from Charles County to the District of Columbia in 1956. In 1955, the Maryland State Roads Commission and the Bureau of Public Roads, the predecessor to the Federal Highway Administration, signed an agreement to transfer ownership of the highway from the federal government to the state roads commission. That same year, the Livingston Road portion of MD 224 from Mason Springs to Washington was transferred to county maintenance.

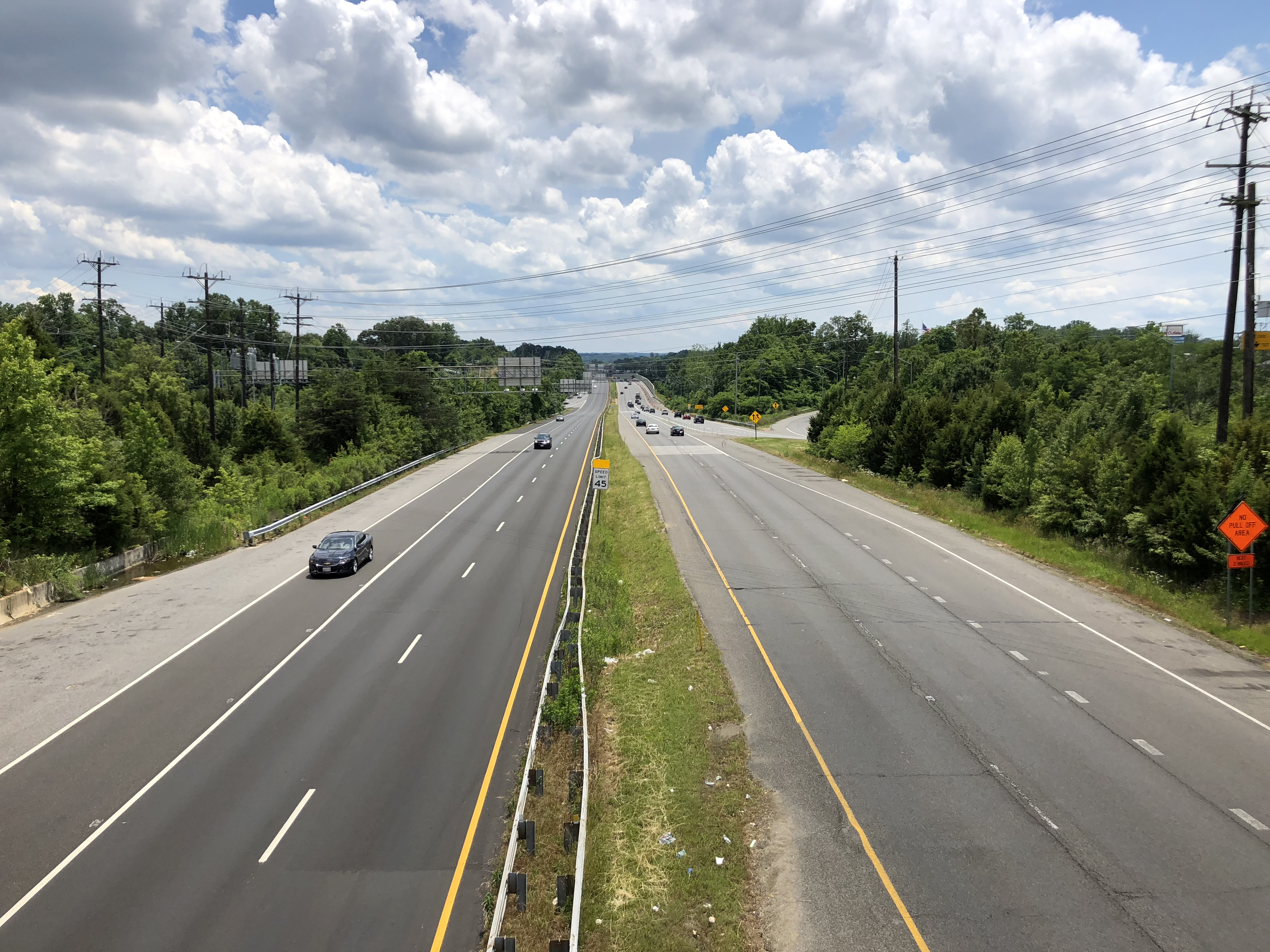
MD 210 southbound in Forest Heights

The first segment of MD 210 to be expanded to a divided highway was from the District of Columbia boundary south to Livingston Road in Forest Heights, which was expanded to a divided highway by 1950. The highway was expanded to a divided highway from Livingston Road south to MD 414 in Forest Heights in 1963, the year MD 210's interchange with the Capital Beltway was completed. This junction was originally a full cloverleaf interchange; the ramp from the northbound Beltway for southbound MD 210 and from southbound MD 210 to the northbound Beltway led to and from intersections with MD 414. MD 210 was made a divided highway from Oxon Hill south to near Fort Foote Road in 1965. The portion of MD 210 in the town of Indian Head also was expanded to a divided highway that year. The divided highway in Charles County was extended east to Bryans Road in 1969 and completed to the county line in 1971. MD 210 was reconstructed as a divided highway from Fort Foote Road to MD 373 in 1983. The last segment of two-lane road on MD 210 was eliminated with expansion of the portion between MD 373 and the Charles–Prince George's county line in 1987.

A pair of long S-shaped ramps were constructed from southbound I-295 to southbound MD 210 and from northbound MD 210 to both northbound I-495 and northbound I-295 in Forest Heights in 1989. MD 210 had been widened to a six-lane highway from MD 228 to the Capital Beltway by 1999. MD 228 was extended west from Charles County to MD 210 as a two-lane road in 1995. That highway was expanded to a four-lane divided highway in 2000; in addition, the MD 210–MD 228 junction was reconstructed as the second continuous-flow intersection in the United States. In 2004, MD 210 achieved its present southern terminus at Potomac Avenue when the highway from there west to the military reservation gate was transferred to the town of Indian Head. MD 210 was reconstructed in Forest Heights starting in 2006 in work related to the construction of the new Woodrow Wilson Bridge. The highway's new bridges over the Capital Beltway and MD 414 and the partial cloverleaf interchange between MD 210 and MD 414 were completed in 2007.

The Maryland State Highway Administration has long-term plans to upgrade the nine signalized intersections along MD 210 between MD 228 and MD 414. The agency completed an intermodal study and received federal approval for upgrades along that corridor in 2005. The first intersection to be upgraded was the junction with Livingston Road and Kerby Hill Road, which was upgraded to a four-ramp partial cloverleaf interchange. In addition, the intersection with Wilson Bridge Drive north of Kerby Hill Road was closed and replaced with a right-in/right-out interchange with southbound MD 210. Partial cloverleaf interchanges will also be constructed at Livingston Road and Palmer Road, and at Swan Creek Road. For the Swan Creek Road project, there will be a pair of additional ramps constructed between northbound MD 210 and Livingston Road and the continuity of the latter road will be restored. Diamond interchanges will be built at Fort Washington Road and at both intersections with Old Fort Road. Interchanges will not be constructed at Farmington Road and MD 373; instead, those intersections will be improved with lengthened and additional auxiliary lanes at each intersection.

Since at least 2003, proposals have been made to change the name on the basis that it is offensive to Native Americans. The Piscataway Conoy Tribe of Maryland has petitioned to have the name changed. In January 2021, Maryland state senators Arthur Ellis and Obie Patterson introduced state legislation to rename the road President Barack Obama Highway. In April 2022, the Maryland General Assembly passed a bill which the media and legislators said would change the name of Indian Head Highway to Piscataway Highway; however, the following month the Maryland State Highway Administration announced that the legislation only "designates" a stretch along Route 210 as Piscataway Highway, with two signs to be installed, leaving the original name in place overall.

== Junction list ==
| County | Location | mi | km | Destinations | Notes |
|---|---|---|---|---|---|
| Charles | Indian Head | 0.00 | 0.00 | Potomac Avenue south / Indian Head Highway west – Indian Head Naval Surface Warfare Center | Southern terminus |
| Charles | Potomac Heights | 1.60 | 2.57 | MD 225 east (Hawthorne Road) – La Plata | Western terminus of MD 225 |
| Charles | Bryans Road | 5.33 | 8.58 | MD 227 (Livingston Road/Marshall Hall Road) – White Plains | |
| Prince George's | Accokeek | 9.37 | 15.08 | MD 228 east (Berry Road) – Waldorf | Continuous-flow intersection; western terminus of MD 228 |
| Prince George's | Accokeek | 9.86 | 15.87 | MD 373 east (Livingston Road) – T.B. | Western terminus of MD 373 |
| Prince George's | Oxon Hill | 19.01 | 30.59 | I-295 north (Anacostia Freeway) / I-95 / I-495 (Capital Beltway) – Washington, Baltimore, Richmond | I-295 Exit 1A; northbound exit, southbound entrance; access to Capital Beltway southbound express lanes; southern terminus of I-295 |
| Prince George's | Forest Heights | 19.52 | 31.41 | MD 414 (Oxon Hill Road) to I-95 north / I-495 north – National Harbor, Silver Hill, Baltimore | Partial cloverleaf interchange; southern terminus of MD 414 |
| Prince George's | Forest Heights | 19.79 | 31.85 | I-95 south / I-495 south (Capital Beltway) – Alexandria, Richmond | I-95/I-495 Exit 3; access to Capital Beltway southbound local lanes |
| Prince George's | Glassmanor | 20.86 | 33.57 | Southern Avenue north / South Capitol Street north – Washington | District of Columbia boundary; northern terminus |
1.000 mi = 1.609 km; 1.000 km = 0.621 mi: Incomplete access

== Auxiliary routes ==
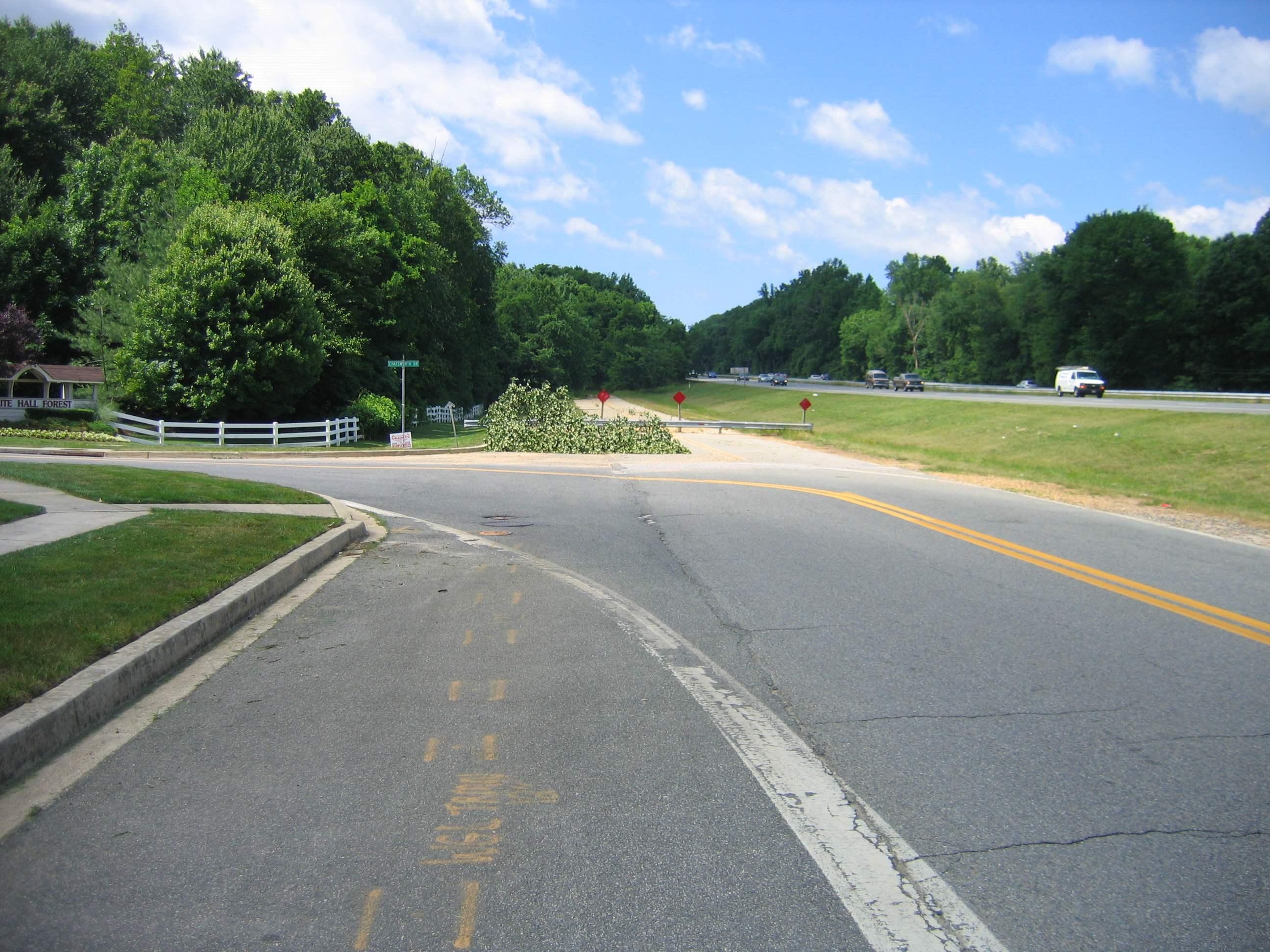
MD 210T frontage road at Chatsworth Drive in Accokeek

MD 210 has 18 auxiliary routes, most of which are frontage roads.

- MD 210A is the designation for Service Road A, a frontage road that runs 0.26 miles (0.42 km) from Kerby Hill Road north to a dead end on the southbound side of MD 210 south of Oxon Hill.
- MD 210B is the designation for Service Road B, a frontage road that runs 0.245 miles (0.394 km) from a barrier north to a dead end north of Barrett Road on the northbound side of MD 210 between Kerby Hill Road and Palmer Road south of Oxon Hill. Access to MD 210 is via a spur near the southern end of the frontage road. The pavement continues south but there is no access to that portion of the frontage.
- MD 210C is the designation for Service Road C, a frontage road that runs 0.01 miles (0.016 km) from Old Fort Road south to a dead end on the southbound side of MD 210 northeast of Fort Washington.
- MD 210D is the designation for Service Road D, a frontage road that runs 0.63 miles (1.01 km) between dead ends on either side of Fort Washington Road on the southbound side of MD 210 northeast of Fort Washington.
- MD 210E is the designation for Service Road E, a frontage road that runs 1.26 miles (2.03 km) from Livingston Road north to a barrier beyond Fort Washington Road on the northbound side of MD 210 east of Fort Washington.
- MD 210F is the designation for Service Road F, a frontage road that runs 0.15 miles (0.24 km) from Old Fort Road south to a dead end on the southbound side of MD 210 east of Fort Washington.
- MD 210I is the designation for Old Palmer Road, a frontage road that runs 0.65 miles (1.05 km) from a gate south of Old Fort Road along the northbound side of MD 210 to the county-maintained portion of Old Palmer Road, which veers away from MD 210 toward Palmer Road.
- MD 210J is the designation for Gospel Union Church Road, a frontage road that runs 0.53 miles (0.85 km) along the southbound side of MD 210 from Shiloh Church Road in Charles County to Livingston Road in Prince George's County. MD 210J originally only existed in Prince George's County; it was extended into Charles County in 2004.
- MD 210K is the designation for Beech Lane, a frontage road that runs 1.85 miles (2.98 km) from MD 810A (Livingston Road) north to a dead end south of the MD 228 junction along the northbound side of MD 210 in Accokeek. MD 210K provides access to MD 810B (Spring Grove Drive), MD 810C (Dale Lane), MD 810D (Maple Lane), and MD 810E (Pine Drive).
- MD 210L is the designation for Beretta Drive, a frontage road that runs 0.20 miles (0.32 km) from a dead end north to MD 810E (Pine Drive) on the southbound side of MD 210 in Accokeek.
- MD 210M is the designation for the 0.15-mile (0.24 km) segment of Holly Road that parallels the southbound side of MD 210 from Accokeek Landing Drive north to the intersection of Holly Road and Holly Way in Accokeek. The road continues north as Holly Way, which is MD 810F.
- MD 210N is the designation for the unnamed 0.55-mile (0.89 km) frontage road that runs from MD 810G (Pine Lane) to MD 810H (Manning Road West) on the southbound side of MD 210 just south of the MD 228 junction in Accokeek.
- MD 210P is the designation for the unnamed 0.56-mile (0.90 km) frontage road that runs from MD 373 north to a dead end beyond Jennifer Drive on the northbound side of MD 210 in Accokeek.
- MD 210R is the designation for Hickory Knoll Road, a frontage road that runs 0.48 miles (0.77 km) from MD 810K (Bryan Point Road) north to Whistling Oak Way and Whistling Wood Court on the southbound side of MD 210 in Accokeek.
- MD 210S is the designation for the 0.05-mile (0.080 km) section of Biddle Road from MD 810J (Livingston Road) north to MD 810K (Bryan Point Road) in Accokeek.
- MD 210T is the designation for the unnamed 0.23-mile (0.37 km) frontage road that runs from a barrier north to Farmington Road on the northbound side of MD 210 in Accokeek. MD 210T was truncated due to the placement of the barrier at its southern terminus in 2005.
- MD 210U is the designation for the unnamed 0.78-mile (1.26 km) frontage road that runs from Farmington Road north to a dead end on the southbound side of MD 210 in Accokeek. MD 210U was constructed in 2002.
- MD 210V is the designation for a 0.45-mile (0.72 km) service road within MD 210's interchange with the Capital Beltway. The route begins as Bald Eagle Road as the north leg of the intersection between MD 414 and that state highway's ramps with southbound MD 210. MD 210V crosses the Beltway, then turns onto the Salt Barn Access Road while Bald Eagle Road continues straight toward the Oxon Hill Farm. The route passes a salt barn before reaching its northern terminus at MD 210's intersection with the southbound exit ramp from the Capital Beltway. The Salt Barn Access Road portion of MD 210V was constructed in 2007. The Bald Eagle Road part of the highway was added in 2009. The roadway was realigned and extended in 2012 to provide a through connection between MD 414 and MD 210.
