= Interstate 295 (Maryland–District of Columbia) =

Highway in the Washington, D.C., area

Interstate 295
- Anacostia Freeway
- I-295 highlighted in red

Route information
- Auxiliary route of I-95
- Maintained by MDSHA and DDOT
- Length: 6.0 mi (9.7 km)
- Existed: 1964–present
- NHS: Entire route

Major junctions
- South end: I-95 / I-495 in Oxon Hill, MD
- North end: I-695 / DC 295 in Washington, DC

Location
- Country: United States
- States: Maryland, District of Columbia
- Counties: MD: Prince George's; DC: City of Washington

Highway system
- Interstate Highway System; Main; Auxiliary; Suffixed; Business; Future
- Maryland highway system; Interstate; US; State; Scenic Byways
- Streets and Highways of Washington, DC; Interstate; US; DC; State-Named Streets
← MD 292	MD	→ MD 295
← I-95	DC	→ DC 295

Interstate 295 (I-295) also known as the Anacostia Freeway, is a six-mile (9.7 km) auxiliary Interstate Highway in the US state of Maryland and in Washington, D.C. It connects I-95/I-495 and Maryland Route 210 (MD 210; Indian Head Highway) near the Potomac River (just outside DC's boundary with Maryland) to I-695 and District of Columbia Route 295 (DC 295) in the Anacostia neighborhood of Washington, D.C.

== Route description ==
Lengths
	mi	km
MD	0.8	1.3
DC	5.2	8.4
Total	6.0	9.7

=== Maryland ===
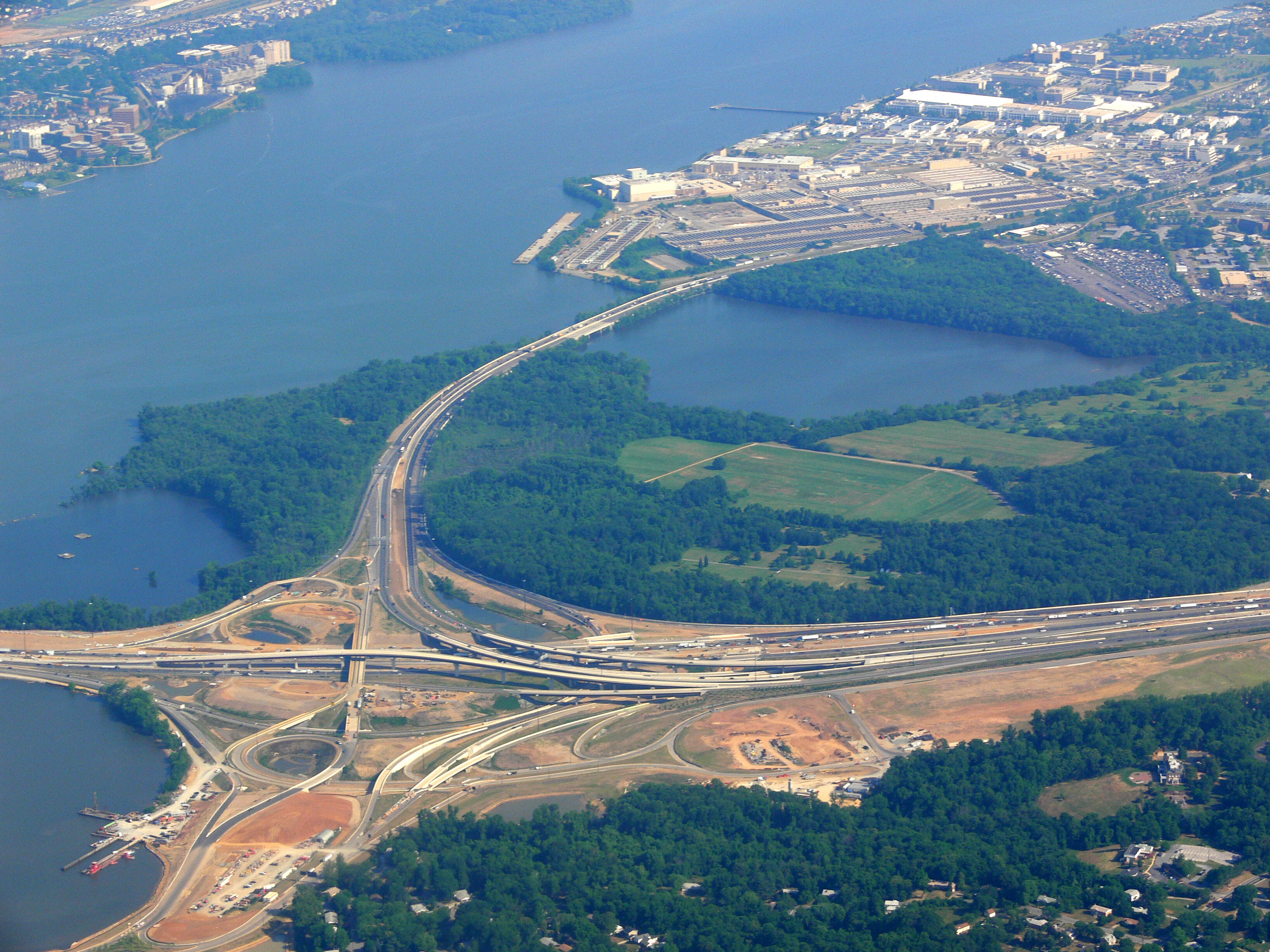
Beginning of I-295 at I-95/I-495 Capital Beltway interchange in 2007

Although I-295 technically begins at the Capital Beltway (I-95/I-495), a pair of mainline ramps connects the southern terminus of the route to the nearby MD 210. Continuing north from this interchange, I-295 enters the District of Columbia; the route is only 0.8 miles (1.3 km) long in Maryland.

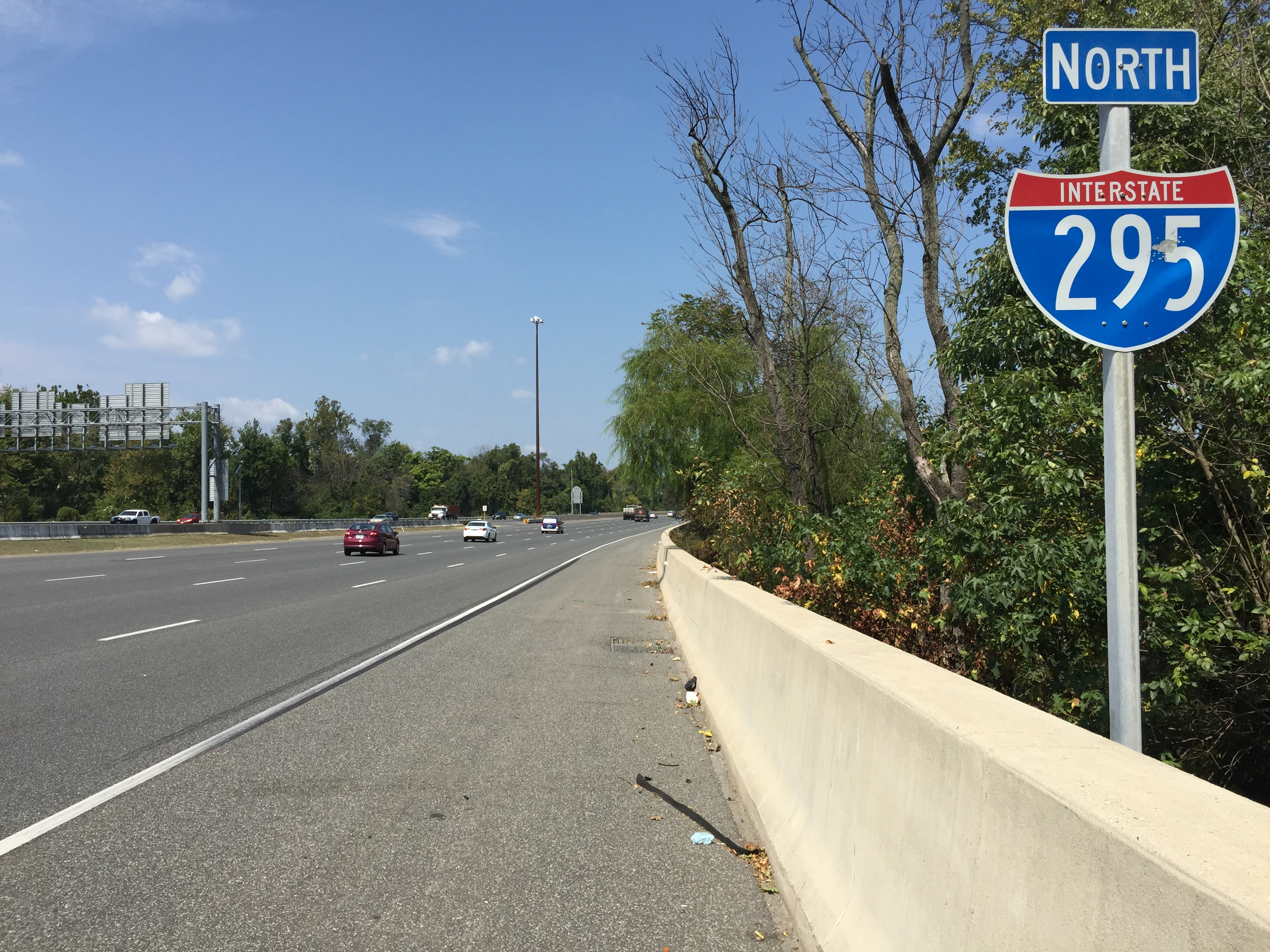
View north at the south end of I-295 at I-95/I-495 in Oxon Hill, Maryland

=== District of Columbia ===
Passing to the west and north of Oxon Cove Park and Oxon Hill Farm, the route parallels the Potomac River, running through the Southeast quadrant of DC. It passes close to Shepard Parkway and forms the eastern boundary of Joint Base Anacostia–Bolling. Near the southern end of Anacostia Park, the route turns east and begins to parallel the Anacostia River, interchanging with South Capitol Street near the latter's crossing of the river.

Within the park, I-295 encounters the junction with I-695 (which heads northwest across the 11th Street Bridges) and DC 295 at exit 4. At this junction, I-295 ends, and the mainline freeway through the interchange assumes the identity of DC 295 and continues to Baltimore, though it changes identities several times: DC 295, MD 201, the Baltimore–Washington Parkway (an unnumbered federally owned expressway operated by the National Park Service), and MD 295.

== History ==
The Anacostia Freeway was first conceived by the Maryland-National Capital Park and Planning Commission in 1950 as a connector route between the Baltimore–Washington Parkway at Kenilworth Avenue and the Capital Beltway near Oxon Hill. The route would provide access to the Anacostia waterfront, which included Bolling Air Force Base (Bolling AFB) and Naval Support Facility Anacostia (NSF Anacostia). In 1955, DC officials approved the portion of the route between Suitland Parkway and East Capitol Street; the remainder of the route was approved in 1956.

In 1958, the southern portion of the route, from the beltway to the 11th Street Bridges, became a part of the Interstate Highway System and the route was designated I-295 by the American Association of State Highway Officials (AASHO).

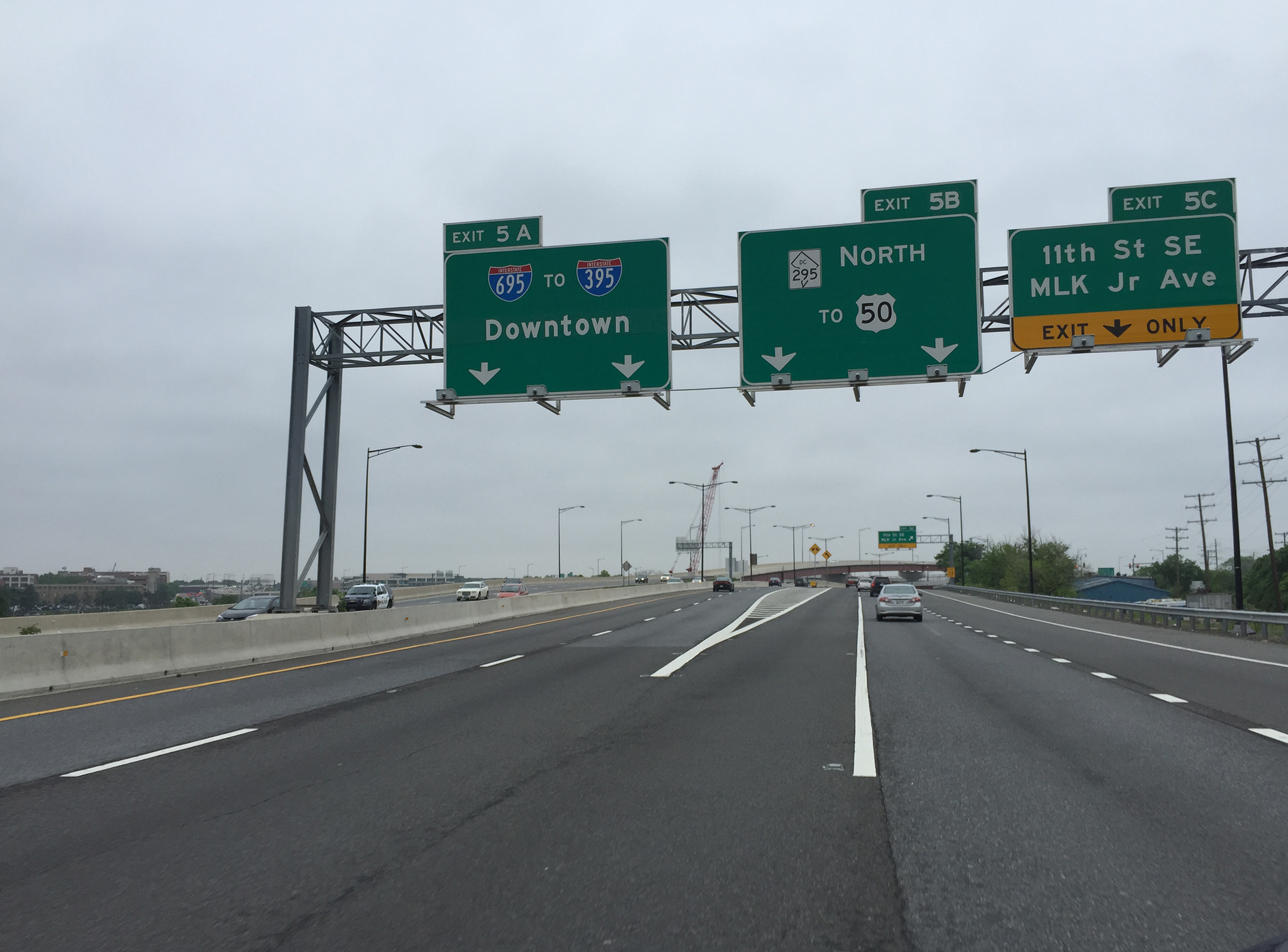
View north at the north end of I-295 at I-695/DC 295 in Washington DC

I-295 opened in pieces. The first section was from the Beltway to South Capitol Street, and the final section of the route, the three miles (4.8 km) from South Capitol Street to the Pennsylvania Avenue interchange, opened on August 7, 1964. The final part of the project, the connecting ramps to the 11th Street Bridges, opened the following year. In 1990, a 1.7-mile (2.7 km) section of connecting ramps was built to directly connect I-295 to MD 210 in order to remove the significant traffic flow between the two routes from the segment of the beltway between both interchanges. These ramps are not considered part of the mainline of I-295.

Under the 1971 DC freeway plans, I-295 would have turned east at the northern end of the 11th Street Bridges and followed the Southeast Freeway as far as East Capitol Street, where it would turn north and follow the East Leg of the Inner Loop freeway. The East Leg, six lanes wide, would have curved around the far eastern edge of the downtown area, passing beneath Mt. Olivet Road in a half-mile (0.80 km) tunnel, before terminating at I-66 and I-95 north of Washington Union Station, providing access to the North Leg Freeway, the North Central Freeway, and the New York Avenue Industrial Freeway.

As part of the larger Woodrow Wilson Bridge reconstruction project, the southern terminus of I-295 has been significantly rebuilt. Several new connections have been constructed to link the beltway, MD 210, and I-295 with the new 300-acre (120 ha) National Harbor site on the shore of the Potomac River in Prince George's County, Maryland. One feature of the interchange reconstruction is that accommodations were made for future ramps to proposed high-occupancy vehicle lanes (HOV) on the beltway. This project was completed in stages, starting in 2008 and ending in 2011.

The cancelation of both the remainder of the Southeast Freeway and then the Barney Circle Freeway left no through connections between the 11th Street Bridges and DC 295 north, leading to severe congestion and major traffic routing problems. These missing movements were included when the northern terminus was reconstructed, allowing direct freeway-grade access to and from DC 295 at the 11th Street Bridges as well as providing a through grade-separated north–south route within DC. Project construction began in 2011 and the ramps opened in 2012. I-295 now terminates at the interchange with the 11th Street Bridges. I-695 extends over the 11th Street Bridges and continues along the Southeast Freeway to the interchange with I-395.

In 2017-2022 the Frederick Douglass Bridge was replaced and, as part of the project, the section of the Anacostia Freeway from Sweetgum Lane north to Chicago Street was replaced, including a new interchange with the Suitland Parkway.

== Future ==
The District of Columbia is considering adding reversible HOV lanes to I-295.

== Exit list ==
State/District	County	Location	mi	km	Exit	Destinations	Notes
Maryland	Prince George's	Oxon Hill	0.00	0.00	–	To MD 210 – Indian Head	Southern terminus
Maryland	Prince George's	Oxon Hill	0.00	0.00	1	I-95 / I-495 – Baltimore, Richmond, Alexandria, National Harbor	Signed as exits 1A (north), 1B (National Harbor), and 1C (south); exit 2B on I-95/I-495
			0.80 0.00	1.29 0.00	Maryland–District of Columbia line		
District of Columbia	Washington	Bellevue	1.29	2.08	1	Laboratory Road – U.S. Naval Research Lab, DC Water, Blue Plains	
District of Columbia	Washington	Bellevue	2.97	4.78	2	South Capitol Street / Malcolm X Avenue / Dorthea Dix Avenue – JBAB, DHS	Signed as exits 2A (South Capitol) and 2B (Malcolm X/Dorthea Dix) southbound
District of Columbia	Washington	Anacostia	4.34	6.98	4	Suitland Parkway east / South Capitol Street – Nationals Park, JBAB, DHS USCG HQ	Western terminus of Suitland Parkway
District of Columbia	Washington	Anacostia	4.49	7.23	4B	Howard Road – Nationals Park	Former southbound exit and northbound entrance; closed as part of the Frederick Douglass Memorial Bridge project
District of Columbia	Washington	Fairlawn	5.0	8.0	5A	I-695 west to I-395 – Downtown	Northbound exit and southbound entrance; future I-395
District of Columbia	Washington	Fairlawn	5.0	8.0	5C	11th Street SE / MLK Jr. Avenue	Northbound exit and southbound entrance
District of Columbia	Washington	Fairlawn	5.03	8.10	5B	DC 295 north (Anacostia Freeway) to I-95 / US 50	Continuation north
1.000 mi = 1.609 km; 1.000 km = 0.621 mi: Closed/former; Incomplete access
