= Oak Grove (La Plata, Maryland) =

Historic house in Maryland, United States

- U.S. National Register of Historic Places
- Location within Maryland Location within the United States
- Location: Turkey Hill Rd., near La Plata, Maryland
- Coordinates: 38°35′10″N 76°59′10″W
- Area: 12 acres (4.9 ha)
- Built: 1800
- Built by: Spalding, Basil
- Architectural style: Federal
- NRHP reference No.: 83003777
- Added to NRHP: November 23, 1983

Oak Grove is a historic home located at La Plata, Charles County, Maryland, United States. It was built in the early Federal style about 1800, and is a one-story, two part brick house of Flemish bond masonry. Two outbuildings date from the 19th century: a small frame dependency built about 1830, and a small corncrib with flanking sheds. Believed to be contemporary in age with the house, it was extensively renovated and partially rebuilt at various times in the 19th and early 20th centuries. The property was originally part of Green's Inheritance.

Oak Grove was listed on the National Register of Historic Places in 1983.
