= Frederick Douglass Memorial Bridge =

Bridge crossing the Anacostia River in Washington, D.C.

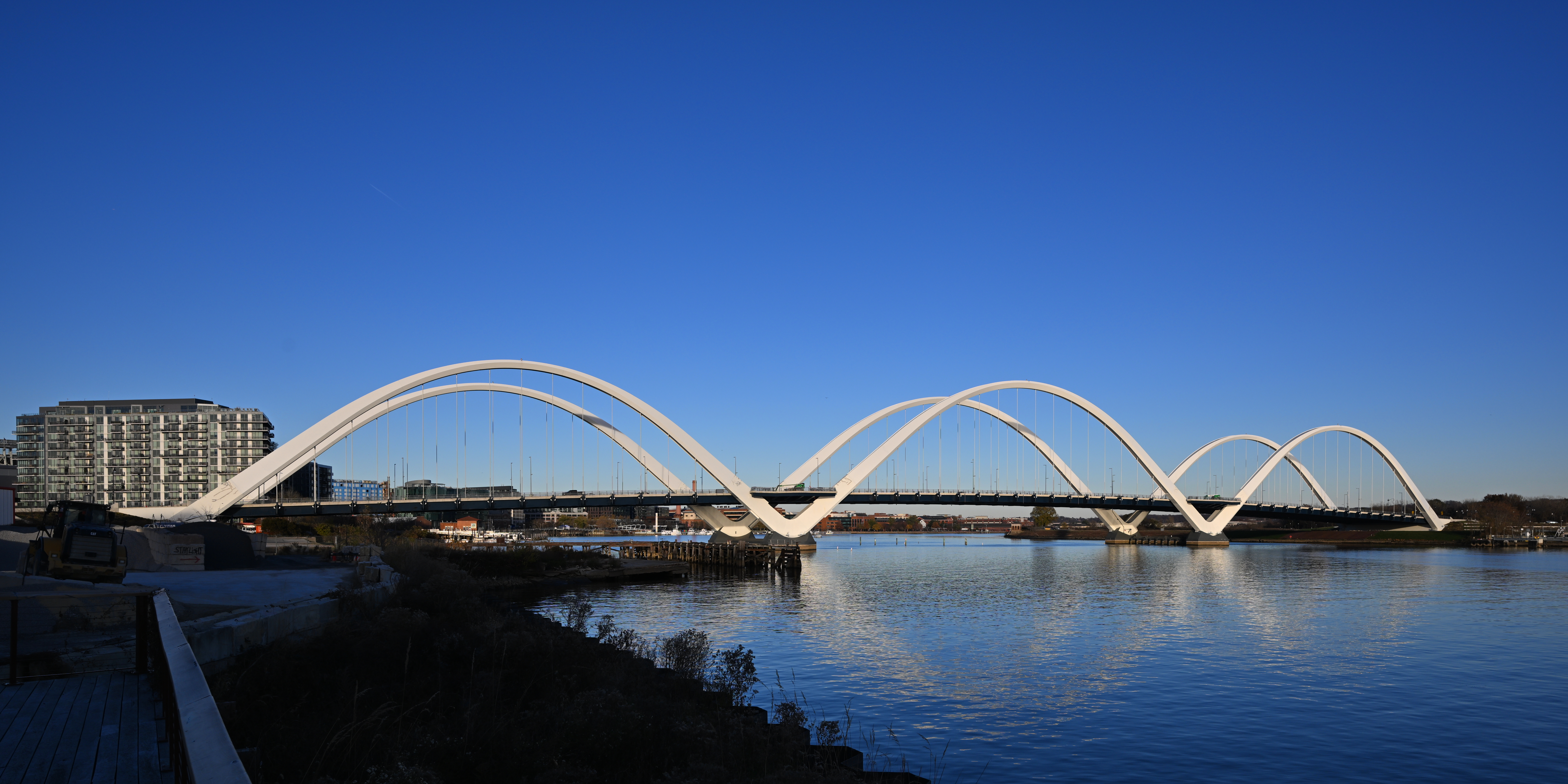
- The rebuilt Frederick Douglass Memorial Bridge in November 2022
- Coordinates: 38°52′6.3″N 77°0′20″W
- Carries: South Capitol Street
- Crosses: Anacostia River
- Locale: Washington, D.C.
- Official name: Frederick Douglass Memorial Bridge
- Other name: South Capitol Street Bridge

Characteristics
- Total length: 1,444 ft (440 m)
- Longest span: 541 ft (165 m)

History
- Construction end: 1950 (original); 2021 (replacement)

Location
- Interactive map of Frederick Douglass Memorial Bridge

The Frederick Douglass Memorial Bridge is a multiple through arch bridge that carries South Capitol Street over the Anacostia River in Washington, D.C. Completed in 2021, it replaced an older swing bridge that was constructed in 1950 as the South Capitol Street Bridge. In 1965, the original bridge was renamed after abolitionist Frederick Douglass. In 2007, the original swing bridge was used by 77,000 daily commuters.

== Original bridge ==
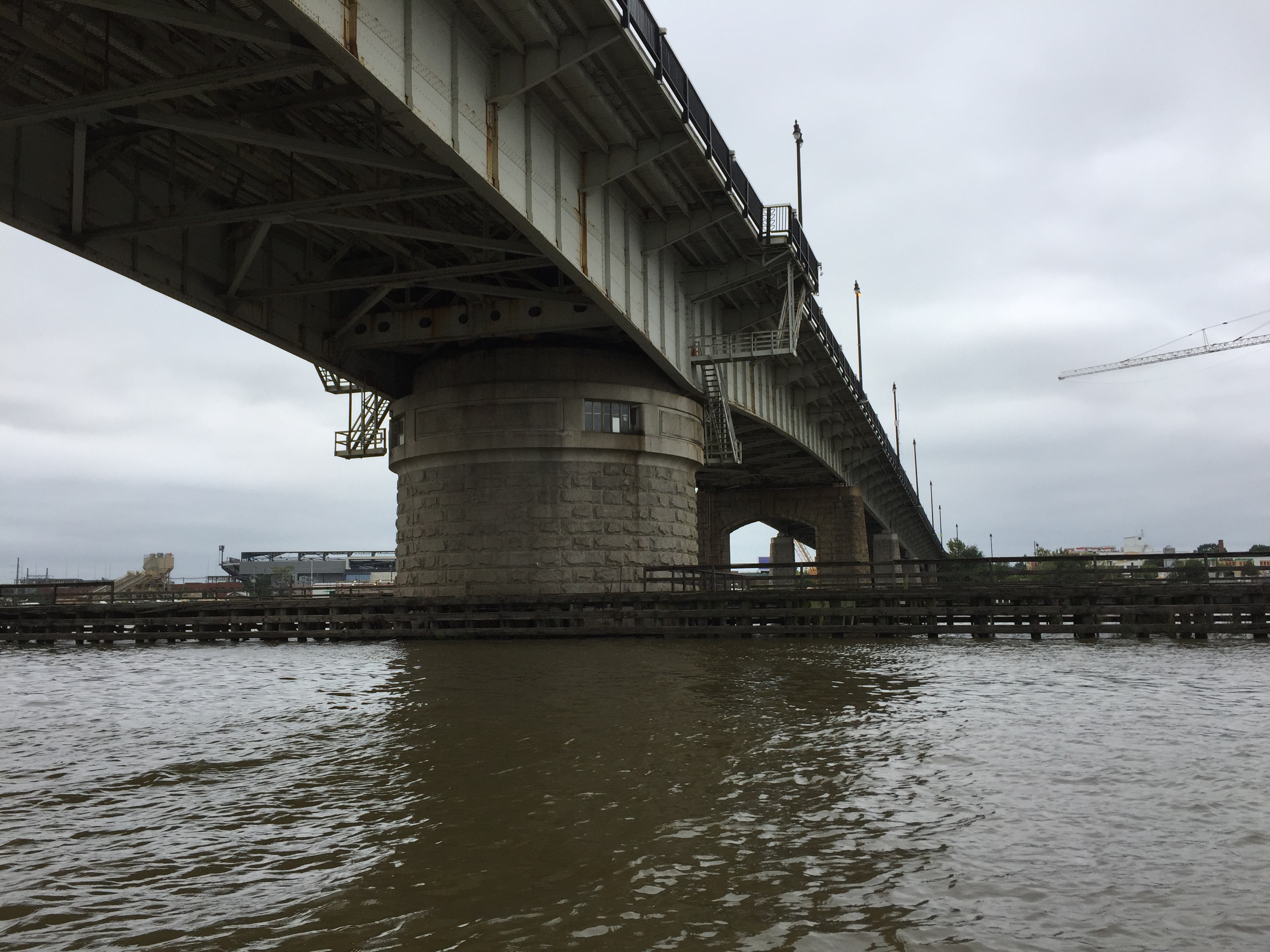
Underside of the original swing bridge in October 2018

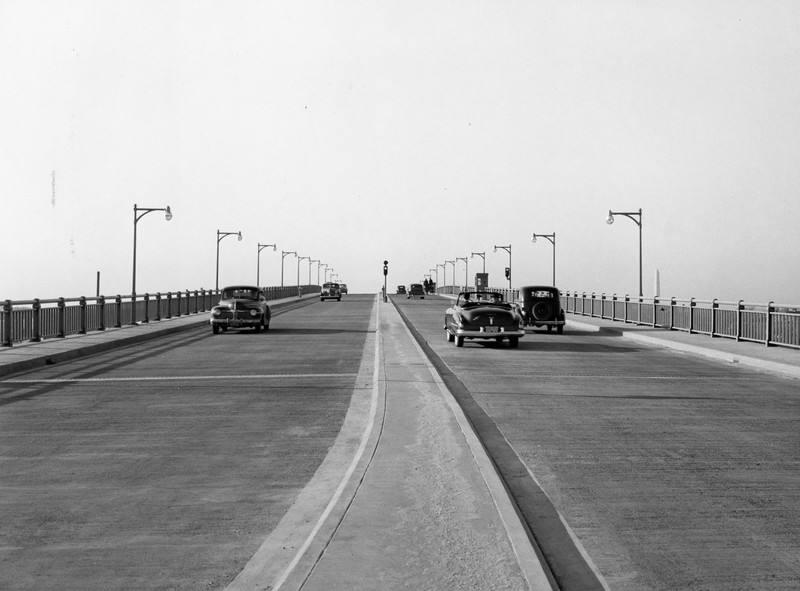
Opening day on the South Capitol Street Bridge in January 1950

The original bridge opened on January 14, 1950, as the South Capitol Street Bridge, though it had previously been called the Victory Bridge by Captain H.C. Whitehurst, the District Director of Highways, because it was the first project started after World War II had ended. At the time it was the longest bridge in the District of Columbia and one of the longest swing bridges in the world. Work on the bridge began in 1945, being advertised 2 weeks after World War II ended, but was stalled in 1947 for four months while the District asked Congress for more money. The bridge ultimately opened in 1950.

What to name the bridge had been a question since before it opened, with people all over the world sending in suggestions. The leading ideas in 1950 were FDR, Theodore Roosevelt, George Washington and Herbert Hoover and Frederick Douglass. One idea suggested in 1950 was Walter Johnson, which would have been prescient since the baseball stadium would be built at the foot of the bridge more than 50 years later. But it was only Douglass who was the subject of an organized movement that submitted a petition with 250 names. It took 14 years, but in 1964 the D.C. Federation of Civic Associations requested that the bridge be named the Frederick Douglass Memorial Bridge and on October 18, 1965, the District's Commissioners voted to name it so, making it both one of the first major bridges named for an African-American or a former slave.

The bridge connects at its southern terminus with Interstate 295 and the Suitland Parkway and thus provides access to downtown from those routes as well as from South Capitol Street and roads connecting to it. As a result, the bridge carries commuter traffic from Prince George's County, Maryland, and from Southern Maryland. The bridge is part of the National Highway System, as are South Capitol Street north of the bridge and the Suitland Parkway.

The bridge was re-decked and widened in 1975–1978 to repair damage, build new approaches and to create room for a 5th lane that would be bus-only in the rush hour direction. The work also narrowed the sidewalks.

In 1988, the swing gate was replaced and as a result of closures the bus-only lane became an all-user lane again.

In 2007, the bridge was closed from July 6 to August 29 for a $27 million renovation project meant to extend its life for 20 years. The northernmost portion of the bridge was demolished, with this came new intersections South Capitol Street and Potomac Avenue and notably more curved northern exit point. The deck was once again replaced and resurfaced, and new street lights and guard rails were added. The access point to the Nationals Park would not open until March 30, 2008.

Despite these repairs, the bridge continued to deteriorate faster than maintenance could keep up. Inspectors found that the bridge's beams had large corrosion holes in its structural beams which necessitated complete replacement of the bridge.

== Current bridge ==
=== Design and construction ===
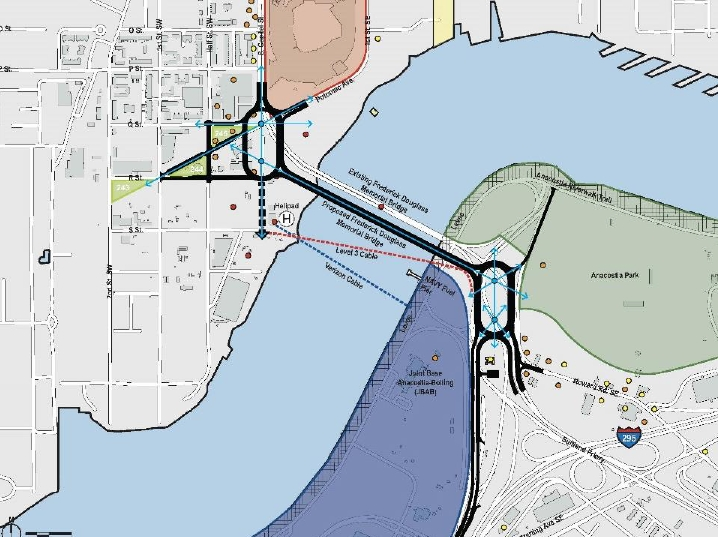
2013 map of the proposed realigned Frederick Douglass Memorial Bridge and new traffic ovals

In late 2012, officials announced a $906 million plan to replace and realign the bridge. The project was to build new interchanges between the bridge and Suitland Parkway, the bridge and Potomac Avenue SW, Suitland Parkway and Interstate 295, and Suitland Parkway and Martin Luther King, Jr. Avenue. The four-lane bridge was to be replaced with a $573.8 million six-lane bridge. A traffic circle with a large field (to be used for public gatherings, and suitable for several new memorials) was to connect the north end of the bridge with Potomac Avenue SW. A second massive traffic oval on the south end of the bridge was to help connect it to Martin Luther King, Jr. Avenue, and help expand the city's "monumental core" into Anacostia. Reconstruction of the two interchanges was estimated to cost $209.2 million. The remainder of the budgeted funds will help renovate New Jersey Avenue SE and turn South Capitol Street from an industrial corridor into an urban boulevard. The two-year project was to begin in 2013. An initial bridge design was submitted to the National Capital Planning Commission and the United States Commission of Fine Arts in summer 2013. The CFA rejected the design in September, called it "uninspired". The agency asked for a design with a more "contemporary approach" and "bolder look".

On January 29, 2014, the District of Columbia Department of Transportation (DDOT) announced the four construction teams that will be asked to solicit final bids on the bridge demolition and construction:

- Frederick Douglass Bridge Partners (a joint venture of Tutor Perini, T.Y. Lin International Group, and Stantec)
- Skanska Facchina (a joint venture of Skanska AB, Facchina Group, and Parsons Transportation)
- South Capitol Constructors (a joint venture of Kiewit Corporation, Corman Construction, and URS Corporation)
- South Capitol Bridge Builders (a joint venture of Archer Western Contractors, Granite Construction, and AECOM)

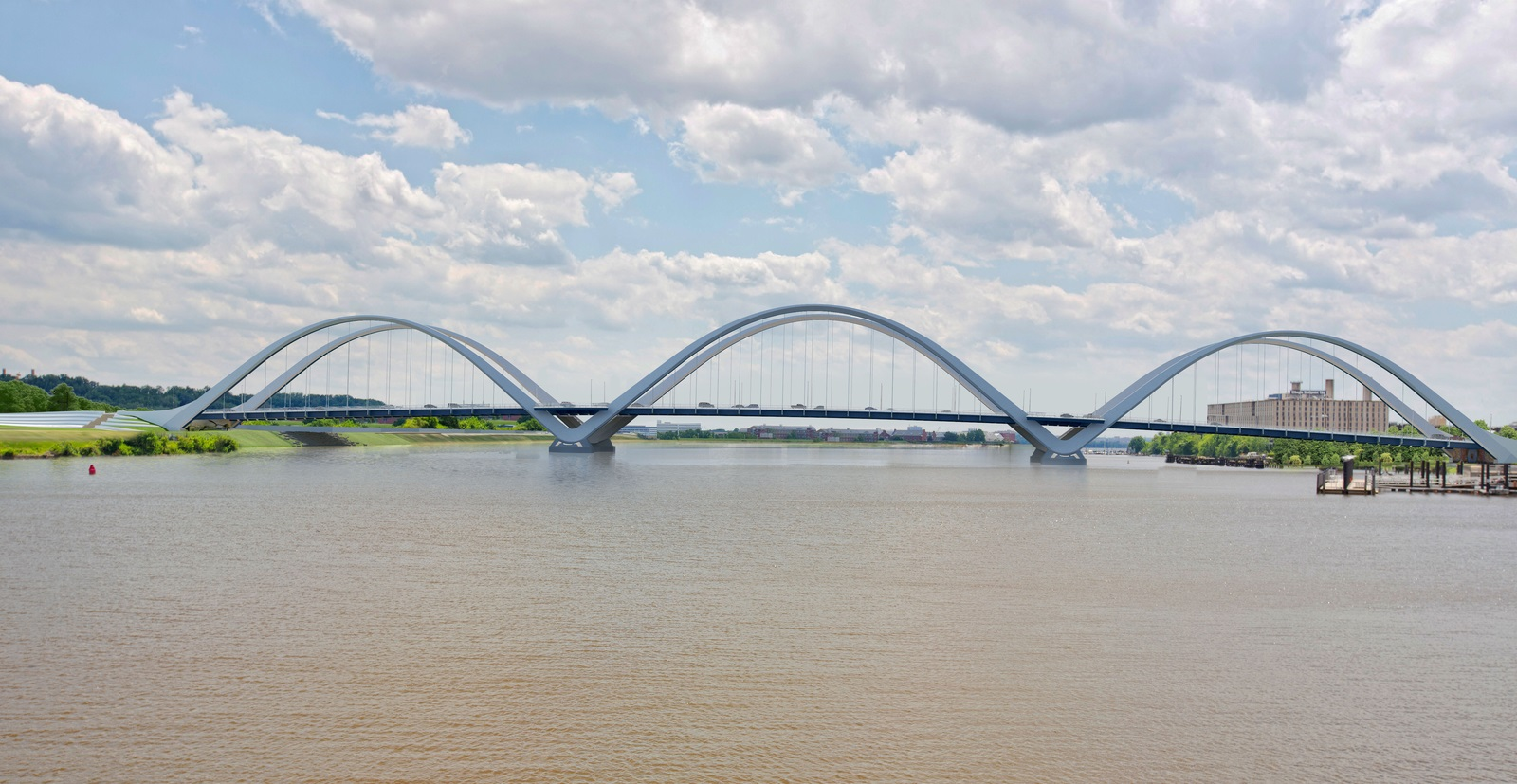
Artist's Impression of the replacement Frederick Douglass Memorial Bridge in August 2017

The cost of the bridge (which included demolition of the existing ramps and construction of the bridge and traffic ovals, but not the Suitland Parkway interchange) was now pegged at $608 million. The new bridge also required the removal of USS Barry (DD-933), the Washington Navy Yard's museum ship, which would have been landlocked by construction of the new span. Mayor Muriel Bowser budgeted $512.7 million over six years, beginning in fiscal 2016, to begin building the bridge.

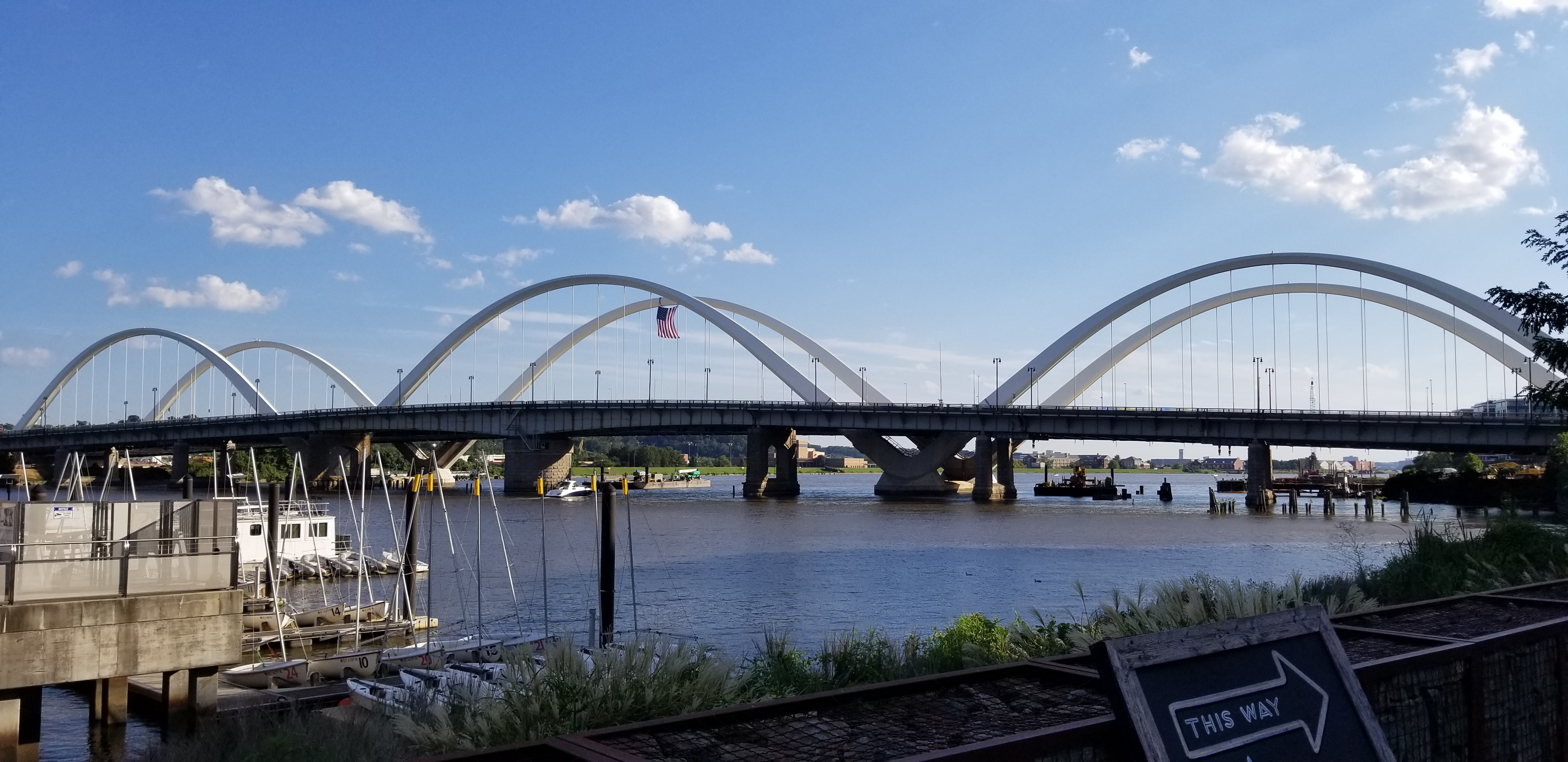
New Fredrick Douglas bridge in September 2021 with the old bridge aligned in front of it

On August 7, 2017, DDOT chose South Capitol Bridge Builders as the contractor team to design and build the new bridge and ovals. The bridge will have six lanes as well as bicycle and pedestrian access. Anacostia Drive was permanently closed under the bridge and access to it from South Capitol Street and Suitland Parkway was curtailed. In 2017, South Capitol Bridge Builders estimated that, if all went well, construction would be finished in December 2021.

DDOT unveiled the new design for the bridge on August 10, 2017. The design is for a 1,600-foot (490 m) long through arch bridge consisting of three sets of parallel white arches. The bridge will have six traffic lanes, and a joint bicycle-pedestrian path on either side of the bridge deck. At both ends of the bridge there will be an esplanade run under the bridge and along the Anacostia River as well as a community park. The bridge is the biggest public works project in the history of the District of Columbia, and employed more than 1,300 workers at the height of construction. The federal government contributed more than $200 million towards the bridge's cost. In 2019 cost of just the bridge was estimated at $480 million.

Work began on the bridge in 2018, in sync with the commemoration of the bicentennial of Frederick Douglass' birth. It was half finished in 2019, with completion expected in 2021.

In a news release in February 2021, Mayor Bowser announced that the bridge was projected to open on October 1. On September 6, 2021, a 5K run was held over the new bridge as part of a ceremony that celebrated its imminent completion. As part of that ceremony, it was announced that the bridge would open to outbound vehicles on September 10, with the inbound lanes opening the next day. Both directions opened on schedule, and the old bridge is scheduled for dismantling once all remaining work is complete. Nighttime closures of the new bridge for up to 15 minutes at a time were scheduled every weekday from September 15 to 29 so crews can finish up construction and conduct tests.

Demolition of the old bridge started in early 2021, when the ramp from the southbound bridge to South Capitol Street was demolished to make room for the approach to the new bridge. The sidewalk along that side of the bridge was closed on February 6, 2021. On September 10 one lane of Southbound traffic was moved from the old bridge to the replacement and then on the 12th all remaining traffic was removed from the original bridge and it was closed to traffic. Full dismantlement started shortly thereafter. Dismantlement took several months. The deck was removed by November and the piers were removed in December. The Abutments were completely gone by February, thereby ending the dismantlement of the old bridge.

=== Operation ===
In June 2022, activist Guido Reichstadter climbed to the top of a bridge arch to protest the overturning of Roe v. Wade; he remained atop the bridge for 28 hours. In May 2026, he repeated the protest action, this time against the 2026 Iran war, AI, and the Trump administration.

== Gallery ==
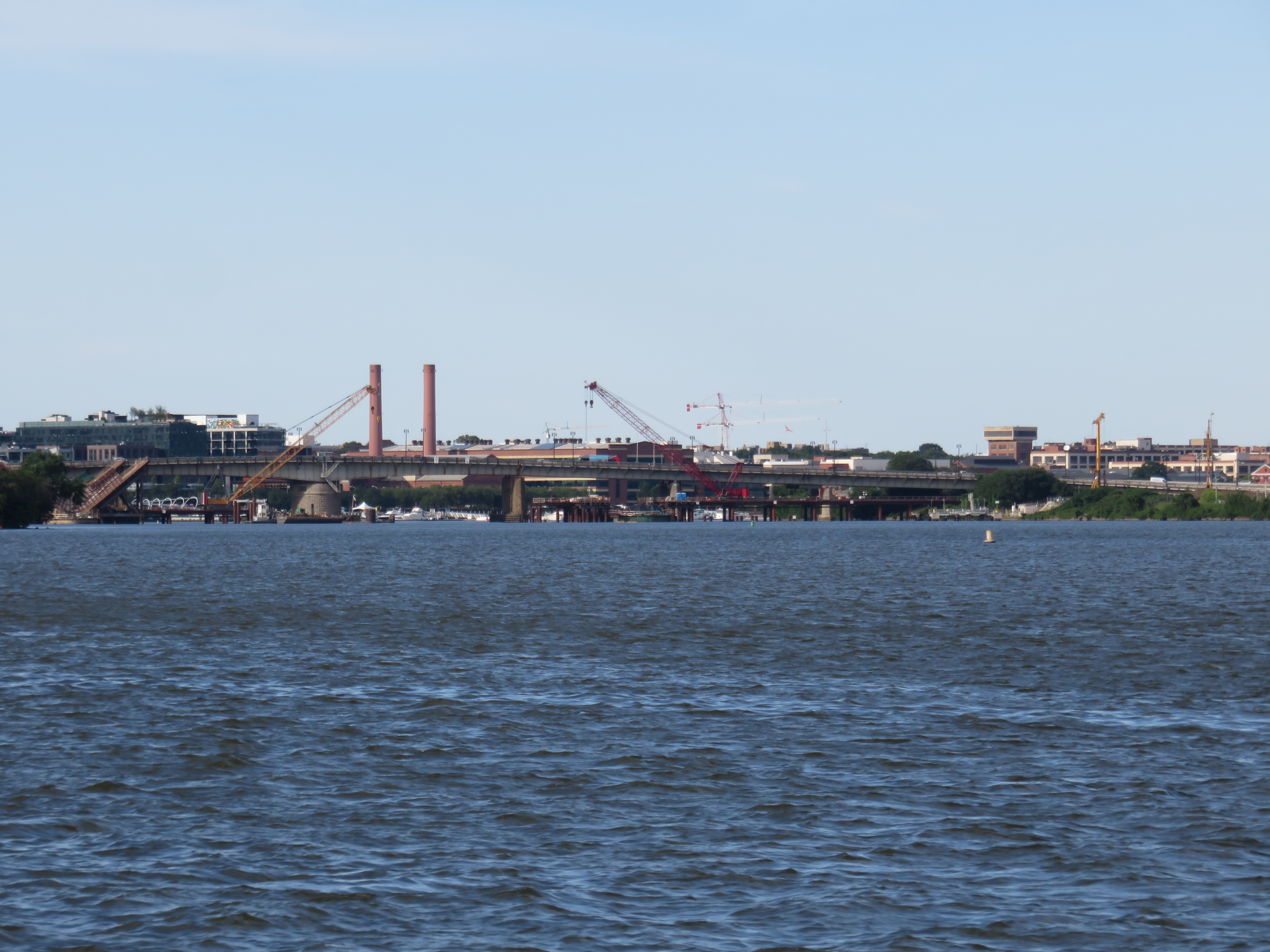
Beginnings of new bridge construction in June 2019

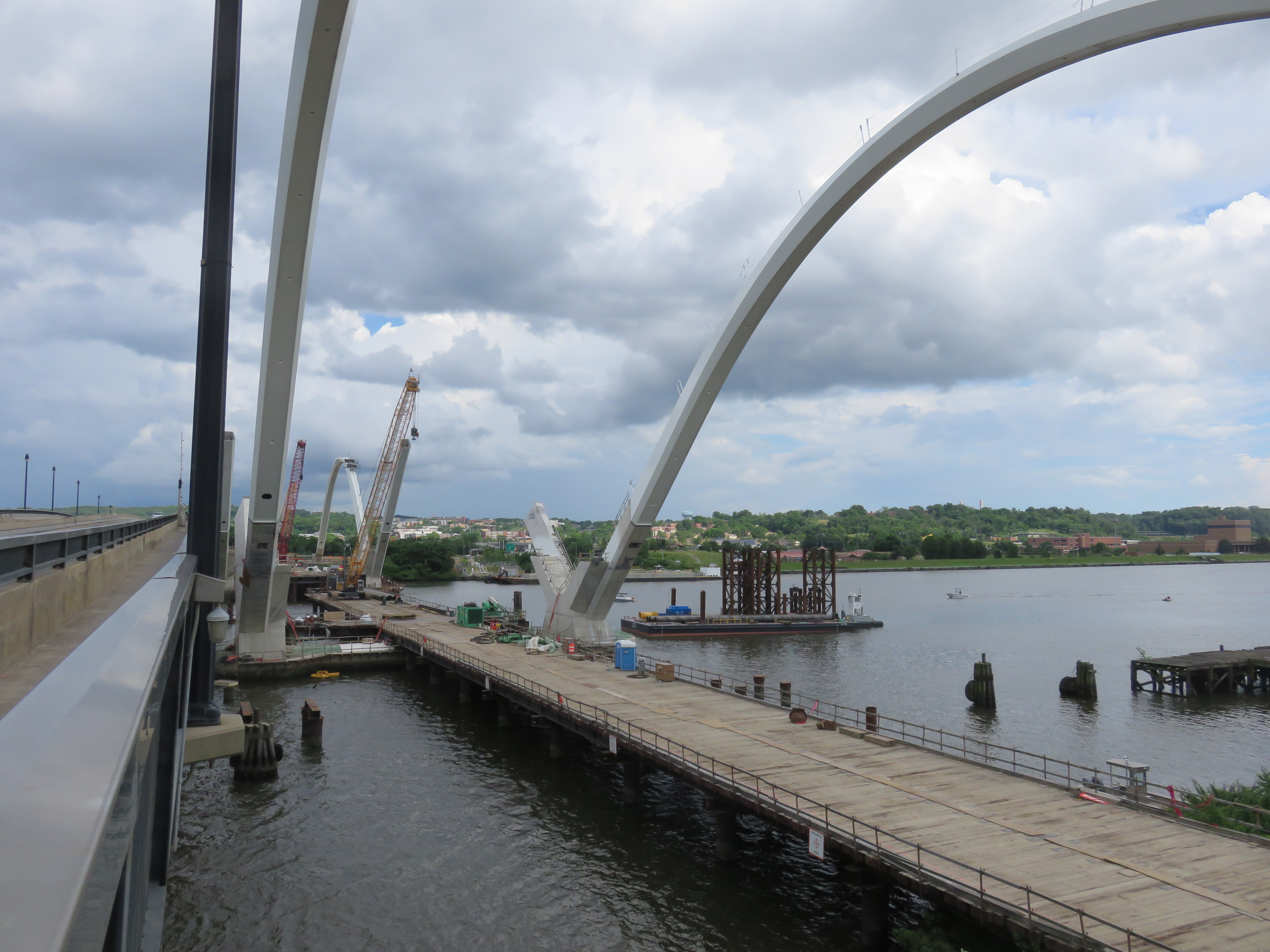
Construction of the arch spans in June 2020

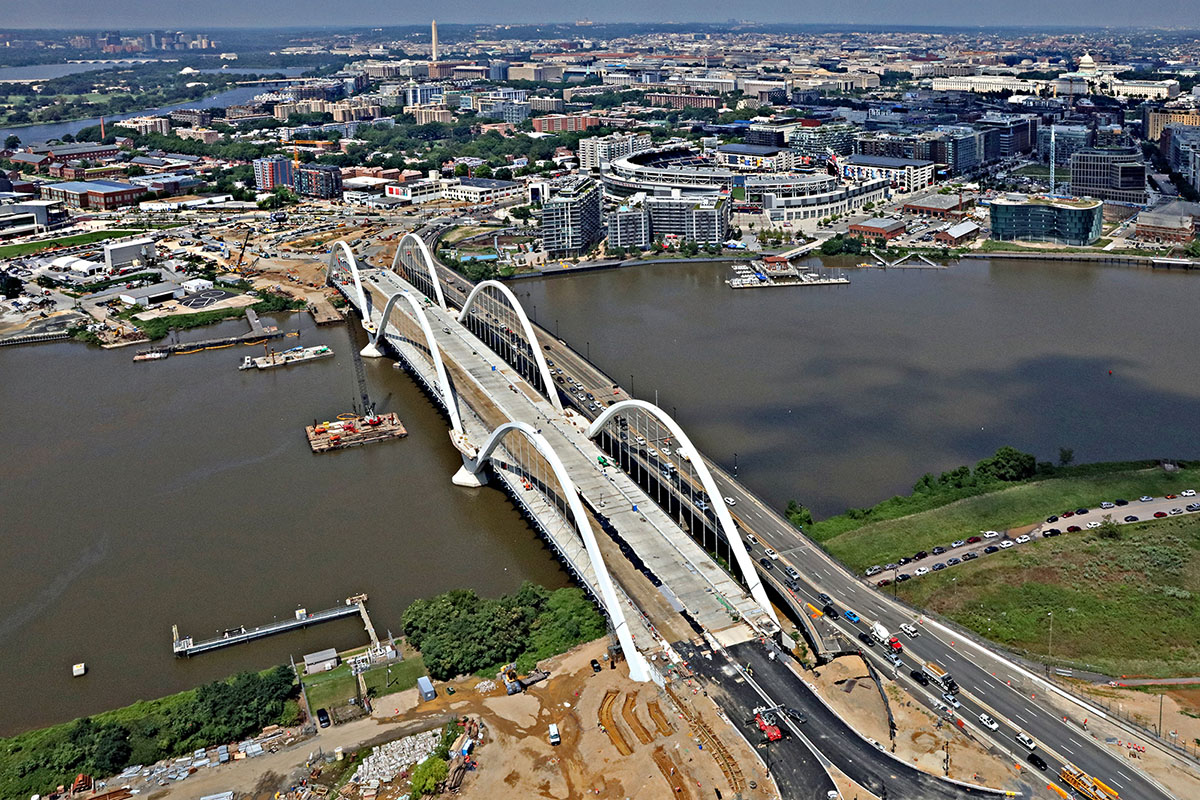
The old and new bridge next to each other in August 2021

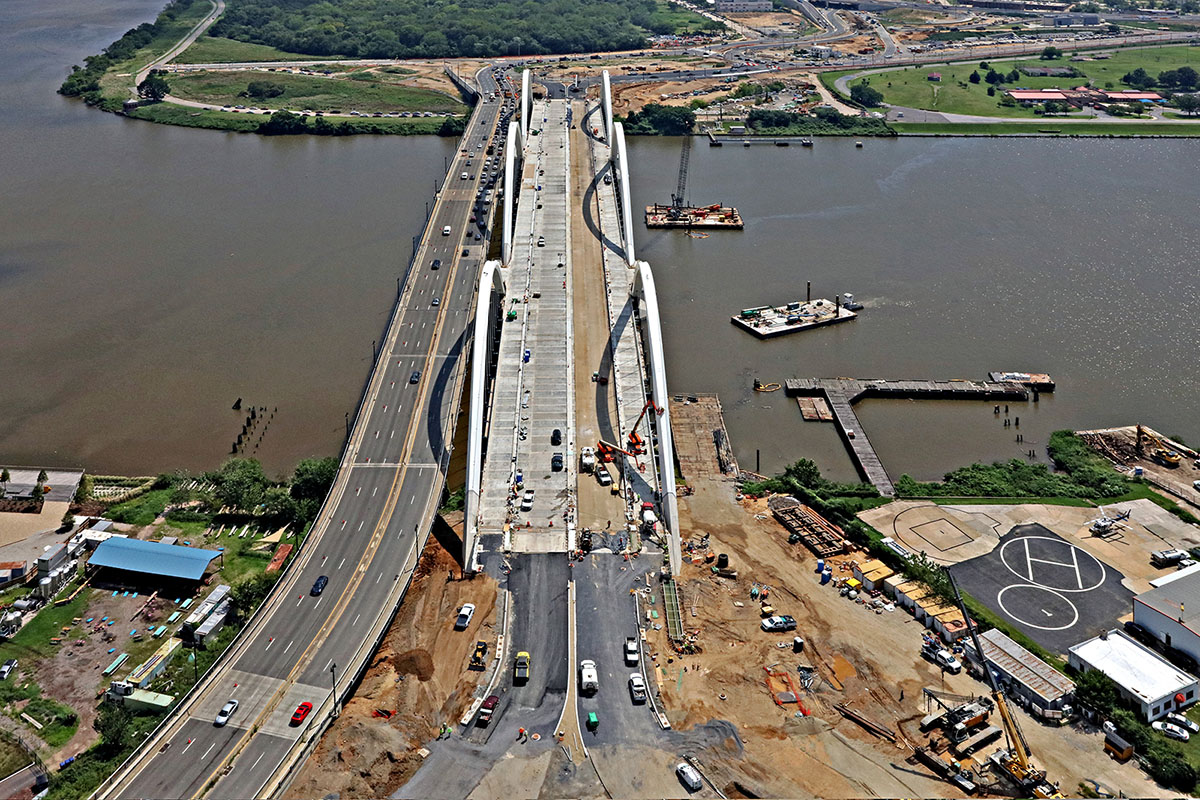
The old and new bridge next to each other in August 2021

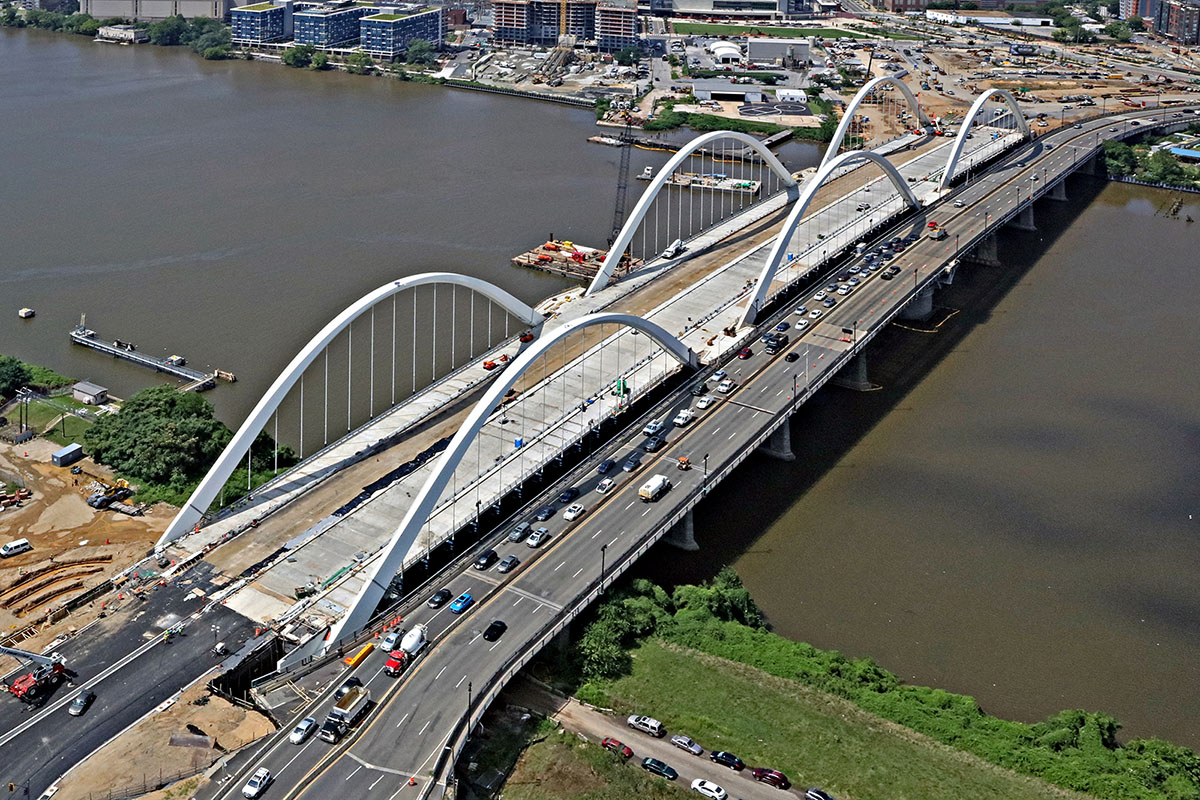
The old and new bridge next to each other in August 2021

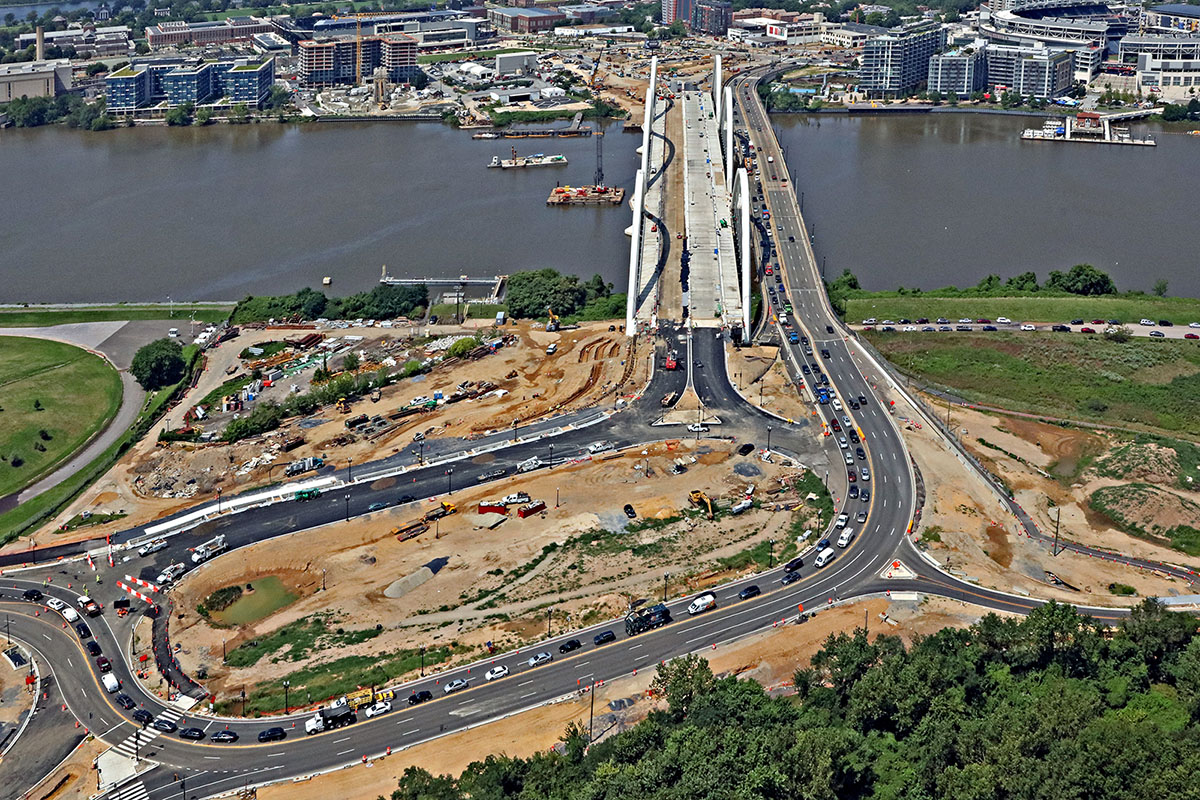
The old and new bridge next to each other in August 2021

== See also ==
- Architecture of Washington, D.C.
- Frederick Douglass
