= Bennsville, Maryland =

Bennsville (Bensville), Maryland
- Census-designated place
- Location of Bennsville, Maryland
- Coordinates: 38°37′24″N 77°0′23″W
- Country: United States
- State: Maryland
- County: Charles

Area
  - Total: 16.90 sq mi (43.78 km^{2})
  - Land: 16.90 sq mi (43.78 km^{2})
  - Water: 0 sq mi (0.00 km^{2})
- Elevation: 184 ft (56 m)

Population (2020)
  - Total: 15,288
  - Density: 904.4/sq mi (349.19/km^{2})
- Time zone: UTC−5 (Eastern (EST))
  - Summer (DST): UTC−4 (EDT)
- FIPS code: 24-06615
- GNIS feature ID: 0589738

Bennsville (spelled Bensville by the United States Census Bureau) is a census-designated place (CDP) in Charles County, Maryland, United States. Per the 2020 census, the population was 15,288. The area is not an official postal designation, but is part of the Waldorf or Pomfret postal area. The Bennsville area is growing with new residential development, encouraged by the extension in the 1990s of Maryland Route 228 which provides quick access to Maryland Route 210. Bennsville has experienced the 2006 opening of North Point High School and the straightening of Middletown Road in 2008.

== Geography ==
Bennsville is located at 38°37′24″N 77°0′23″W (38.623302, −77.006265).

According to the United States Census Bureau, the CDP has a total area of 16.9 square miles (43.8 km^{2}), all land.

== Demographics ==
Historical population
Census	Pop.	Note	%±
2000	7,325		—
2010	11,923		62.8%
2020	15,288		28.2%
U.S. Decennial Census; 2010 2020; Bennsville prior to 2010

The CDP was known as Bennsville prior to the 2010 U.S. Census after which it was changed to the current form of Bensville.

=== 2020 census ===
Bensville CDP, Maryland – Racial and ethnic composition Note: the US Census treats Hispanic/Latino as an ethnic category. This table excludes Latinos from the racial categories and assigns them to a separate category. Hispanics/Latinos may be of any race.
Race / Ethnicity (NH = Non-Hispanic)	Pop 2000	Pop 2010	Pop 2020	% 2000	% 2010	% 2020
White alone (NH)	5,512	5,131	3,957	75.25%	43.03%	25.88%
Black or African American alone (NH)	1,304	5,238	8,521	17.80%	43.93%	55.74%
Native American or Alaska Native alone (NH)	29	59	51	0.40%	0.49%	0.33%
Asian alone (NH)	169	496	731	2.31%	4.16%	4.78%
Native Hawaiian or Pacific Islander alone (NH)	7	10	7	0.10%	0.08%	0.05%
Other race alone (NH)	8	33	90	0.11%	0.28%	0.59%
Mixed race or Multiracial (NH)	135	437	988	1.84%	3.67%	6.46%
Hispanic or Latino (any race)	161	519	943	2.20%	4.35%	6.17%
Total	7,325	11,923	15,288	100.00%	100.00%	100.00%

=== 2000 Census ===
As of the census of 2000, there were 7,325 people, 2,429 households, and 2,071 families residing in the CDP. The population density was 431.6 inhabitants per square mile (166.6/km^{2}). There were 2,493 housing units at an average density of 146.9 per square mile (56.7/km^{2}). The racial makeup of the CDP was 76.46% White, 18.02% African American, 0.41% Native American, 2.32% Asian, 0.10% Pacific Islander, 0.55% from other races, and 2.14% from two or more races. Hispanic or Latino of any race were 2.20% of the population.

There were 2,429 households, out of which 43.4% had children under the age of 18 living with them, 74.9% were married couples living together, 7.5% had a female householder with no husband present, and 14.7% were non-families. 10.5% of all households were made up of individuals, and 2.1% had someone living alone who was 65 years of age or older. The average household size was 3.01 and the average family size was 3.25.

In the CDP, the population was spread out, with 28.1% under the age of 18, 6.8% from 18 to 24, 32.5% from 25 to 44, 27.4% from 45 to 64, and 5.3% who were 65 years of age or older. The median age was 36 years. For every 100 females, there were 97.5 males. For every 100 females age 18 and over, there were 97.3 males.

The median income for a household in the CDP was $83,388, and the median income for a family was $85,988. Males had a median income of $51,770 versus $39,797 for females. The per capita income for the CDP was $29,677. About 0.4% of families and 1.5% of the population were below the poverty line, including none of those under age 18 and 5.5% of those age 65 or over.
