= Potomac Heights, Maryland =

- Census-designated place
- Location of Potomac Heights, Maryland
- Coordinates: 38°36′5″N 77°7′56″W
- Country: United States
- State: Maryland
- County: Charles

Area
  - Total: 1.32 sq mi (3.42 km^{2})
  - Land: 1.07 sq mi (2.78 km^{2})
  - Water: 0.25 sq mi (0.64 km^{2})
- Elevation: 59 ft (18 m)

Population (2020)
  - Total: 1,036
  - Density: 965.4/sq mi (372.73/km^{2})
- Time zone: UTC−5 (Eastern (EST))
  - Summer (DST): UTC−4 (EDT)
- FIPS code: 24-63375
- GNIS feature ID: 0591058
- Website: www.potomacheightshoa.com

Potomac Heights is a census-designated place (CDP) in Charles County, Maryland, United States. The population was 1,117 at the 2010 census. It has a volunteer fire department and numerous older rambler homes built for workers at the nearby U.S. Navy munitions plant in Indian Head (now known as the Indian Head Naval Surface Warfare Center).

== Geography ==
Potomac Heights is located at 38°36′5″N 77°7′56″W (38.601268, −77.132316).

According to the United States Census Bureau, the CDP has a total area of 1.3 square miles (3.4 km^{2}), of which 1.1 square miles (2.8 km^{2}) is land and 0.2 square miles (0.52 km^{2}), or 15.04%, is water.

== Demographics ==
Historical population
Census	Pop.	Note	%±
2020	1,036		—
U.S. Decennial Census

As of the census of 2000, there were 1,154 people, 543 households, and 312 families residing in the CDP. The population density was 1,016.8 inhabitants per square mile (392.6/km^{2}). There were 569 housing units at an average density of 501.4 per square mile (193.6/km^{2}). The racial makeup of the CDP was 93.07% White, 5.55% African American, 0.17% Native American, 0.61% from other races, and 0.61% from two or more races. Hispanic or Latino of any race were 0.95% of the population.

There were 543 households, out of which 24.7% had children under the age of 18 living with them, 38.5% were married couples living together, 13.1% had a female householder with no husband present, and 42.5% were non-families. 39.0% of all households were made up of individuals, and 22.3% had someone living alone who was 65 years of age or older. The average household size was 2.13 and the average family size was 2.81.

In the CDP, the population was spread out, with 21.7% under the age of 18, 7.0% from 18 to 24, 29.6% from 25 to 44, 20.4% from 45 to 64, and 21.3% who were 65 years of age or older. The median age was 40 years. For every 100 females, there were 83.2 males. For every 100 females age 18 and over, there were 78.7 males.

The median income for a household in the CDP was $35,556, and the median income for a family was $45,833. Males had a median income of $34,837 versus $29,722 for females. The per capita income for the CDP was $19,656. About 5.2% of families and 7.0% of the population were below the poverty line, including 11.0% of those under age 18 and 9.2% of those age 65 or over.

== History ==
In 1947, the residents of Potomac Heights formed a co-operative and purchased the entire community from the previous owners (the US government). It was built in 1940–1943 to provide housing for defense workers. Today, to obtain the right to occupy one of the co-op residences, one must first apply for and be accepted for membership in the co-operative. To gain acceptance one must meet the criteria established by voting members of the co-op.

Potomac Heights is one of many housing co-operatives in the Washington, D.C. metropolitan area, three of which were converted from government sponsored housing. The largest co-operative, Greenbelt, located in adjoining Prince George's County, evolved from one of three planned communities (Greendale, Wisconsin, and Greenhills, Ohio) and developed as a federally supervised experiment in cooperative living under the New Deal during the Roosevelt administration. Hillwood Square Mutual in Falls Church, Virginia, was built to house workers at the Torpedo Factory in Alexandria.
