= Green's Inheritance =

Historic house in Maryland, United States

- U.S. National Register of Historic Places
- Location within Maryland Location within the United States
- Location: Northeast of Pomfret on Maryland Route 227, Pomfret, Maryland
- Coordinates: 38°35′19″N 77°1′13″W
- Area: 30 acres (12 ha)
- Built: 1850
- Architect: Green, Francis Caleb
- Architectural style: Georgian
- NRHP reference No.: 77000692
- Added to NRHP: December 16, 1977

Green's Inheritance is a historic home located at Pomfret, Charles County, Maryland, United States on Piscataway Conoy land. It is a 2 1/2-story gable-roofed house of common bond brick, built about 1850. The house has a basic Georgian plan. It is the only brick house in Charles County dating between the years 1835 and 1880. The house was built by Francis Caleb Green, on part of the 2,400 acres (970 ha) of land granted in 1666 to the sons of Thomas Greene, the second Provincial Governor of Maryland, who named it "Green's Inheritance."

Green's Inheritance, formerly known as "Green Park", and home to the wealthy and prominent branch of the Green Family of Charles County, is a simple but dignified 2 1/2-story gable-roofed house of common bond brick, 56' by 36'. Built c. 1850, it has a basic Georgian plan, incorporating an interesting combination of late Federal and Greek Revival features. The five-bay principal facade faces southeast. The centered, double-leafed entrance door, with transom and sidelights, has a simple Greek Revival-style wood enframement. The proportions and simplicity of a one-story porch with a shallow pedimented roof and square posts sheltering the entrance suggest a Greek Revival influence. The four windows on the first floor and five on the second frame 6/6 sash and have plain wood sills and flat wood lintels. On the latter, at both floor levels, are flat pieces of wood applied in a manner to suggest recessed flat arches within the rectangular lintels, a rather curious treatment that is apparently original. A second interesting feature is a four-course brick belt or panel below the stepped brick roof cornice that extends to within 18" of the ends of the house. The north, or rear, elevation repeats the same fenestration and door placement of the front. However, the wood lintels of the windows are unornamented, and there is no belt course or panel below the eave cornice, and no porch sheltering the door. The door, fronted by a semi-circular brick stoop, is framed in the same basic manner as the front, but has a simulated, all-wood overlight. In 1941 a one-story porch extending the full width of this elevation was removed and replaced by the existing brick stoop and brick terrace. The east end of the house is unbroken except for a window at the attic level. On the west side there is a centered window at the second floor. The roof has two flush gable chimneys at each end. On the front and back slopes of the roof are three pedimented dormer windows, each of 6/6 sash. There is no watertable at the base of the house, although at one time the first several courses up from ground level were painted black. Small metal grilled openings at the base of the building serve to ventilate the crawl space beneath the first-floor joists. In 1941 a one-story, three-bay kitchen addition of old brick with a shallow gable roof was built against the west end of the house, replacing an older frame wing.

Green's Inheritance is an important landmark, regionally significant architecturally and historically. Its architecture and date of construction very nearly make it unique within the lower Southern Maryland region.

In about 1825 the counties of Charles, Calvert, St. Mary's, and lower Prince George's began feeling the accumulated effect of a series of economic depressions, the last caused in large measure by the over-cultivation of tobacco, changing agricultural practices, industrialization, and the shifting of a rural society to one more urban. During the two decades preceding and following the Civil War almost all building activity ceased within the region. Green's Inheritance is therefore one of only a handful of extant buildings dating from this period in this area. It is, in fact, the only brick house in Charles County dating between the years 1835 and 1880. Considering the critical economic situation of the region at this time, it is remarkable that anyone could afford such an extravagance, particularly when many families of greater wealth and social prominence were crumbling.

The house should then be recognized as a testament to the builder, who buy all accounts was a quiet, honest yet resourceful and imaginative "gentleman farmer." The significance of Green's Inheritance, however, lies not only in its architectural value but also in the history of the property and the Green family. The house is believed to have been built about 1850 by Francis Caleb Green, on land granted in 1666 to the sons of Thomas Green, the second Provincial Governor of Maryland. Francis Caleb Green (1795-1851) held the rank of Sergeant during the War of 1812–14, and was actively involved in county affairs. His son, Francis Basil Green (1832-1907), was also active in local affairs, but especially in the concerns of nearby St. Joseph's Church, to which he donated land for expansion. His children sold the house to the late Major General DeWitt Peck, U.S.M.C., in 1941. It was during Peck's tenure that many of the renovations took place.

The well-documented affairs of the Green family provide more than a superficial glimpse into the life of an average Maryland family throughout a period of some 250 years. The house, as a part of this record, provides a valuable focal point on which a historical study of socio-economic conditions in Southern Maryland, as reflected by the activities of several generations of a single family, could be based.

Green's Inheritance was listed on the National Register of Historic Places in 1977.
