= National Register of Historic Places listings in Charles County, Maryland =

Location of Charles County in Maryland

This is a list of the National Register of Historic Places listings in Charles County, Maryland.

This is intended to be a complete list of the properties and districts on the National Register of Historic Places in Charles County, Maryland, United States. Latitude and longitude coordinates are provided for many National Register properties and districts; these locations may be seen together in a map.

There are 43 properties and districts listed on the National Register in the county, including 1 National Historic Landmark. Two other sites in the county were once listed on the Register but have been removed.

Contents: Counties in Maryland
Allegany - Anne Arundel - Baltimore (city) - Baltimore County - Calvert - Caroline - Carroll - Cecil - Charles - Dorchester - Frederick - Garrett - Harford - Howard - Kent - Montgomery - Prince George's - Queen Anne's - Somerset - St. Mary's - Talbot - Washington - Wicomico - Worcester

This National Park Service list is complete through NPS recent listings posted February 20, 2026.

== Current listings ==
	Name on the Register	Image	Date listed	Location	City or town	Description
1	Acquinsicke		February 20, 1992 (#92000070)	Billingsley Rd. west of its junction with Maryland Route 228; 38°36′30″N 77°02′14″W	Pomfret	
2	Araby	Araby	July 25, 1974 (#74000947)	Southeast of Mason on Maryland Route 425; 38°34′43″N 77°06′54″W	Mason's Springs	
3	Bel Alton High School	Bel Alton High School	February 3, 2025 (#100011395)	9501 Crain Highway; 38°27′07″N 76°59′26″W	Bel Alton	A former high school building, now housing other facilities.
4	Bryantown Historic District	Bryantown Historic District	March 14, 1985 (#85000590)	Maryland Route 5 and County Route 232; 38°33′11″N 76°50′39″W	Bryantown	
5	Cedar Grove		March 2, 1979 (#79001124)	South of La Plata off Maryland Route 6 west of Blossom Point Rd. 38°28′50″N 77°04′22″W	La Plata	
6	Ellerslie	Ellerslie	September 24, 1979 (#79003264)	West of Port Tobacco on Maryland Route 6; 38°30′20″N 77°02′29″W	Port Tobacco	
7	The Exchange		June 7, 1984 (#84001763)	7310 Greenland Place; 38°30′54″N 76°58′23″W	La Plata	
8	Green's Inheritance		December 16, 1977 (#77000692)	Northeast of Pomfret on Maryland Route 227; 38°35′19″N 77°01′13″W	Pomfret	
9	Habre-de-Venture; Thomas Stone National Historic Site	Habre-de-Venture; Thomas Stone National Historic Site	October 31, 1972 (#72001595)	6655 Rose Hill Rd., near its junction with Maryland Routes 6 and 225; 38°31′55″N 77°01′53″W	Port Tobacco	
10	The Hermitage	The Hermitage	July 23, 1998 (#98000886)	Washington Ave. 38°32′02″N 76°58′52″W	La Plata	
11	Hughesville Commercial and Tobacco Warehouse Historic District		May 29, 2025 (#100011907)	Old Leonardtown and Burnt Store-Prince Frederick Roads; 38°31′59″N 76°47′03″W	Hughesville	
12	Johnsontown Tobacco Barn No. 2	Johnsontown Tobacco Barn No. 2	December 27, 2011 (#11000947)	9830 Johnsontown Rd. 38°29′12″N 76°58′17″W	La Plata vicinity	part of the Tobacco Barns of Southern Maryland MPS
13	La Grange	La Grange	October 22, 1976 (#76000990)	Maryland Route 6, west of U.S. Route 301; 38°31′27″N 76°59′28″W	La Plata	
14	Linden	Linden	November 23, 1977 (#77000693)	North of Port Tobacco on Mitchell Rd. 38°33′16″N 77°00′46″W	Port Tobacco	
15	The Lindens	The Lindens	April 23, 1990 (#90000607)	Maryland Route 488; 38°33′07″N 76°52′32″W	Bryantown	
16	Locust Grove	Locust Grove	July 21, 1978 (#78001454)	West of La Plata on Maryland Route 225; 38°32′32″N 77°01′22″W	La Plata	
17	Mallows Bay-Widewater Historic and Archeological District	Mallows Bay-Widewater Historic and Archeological District	April 24, 2015 (#15000173)	Off Charles County shoreline at Sandy Pt. 38°28′21″N 77°16′07″W	Nanjemoy vicinity	
18	Marshall Hall	Marshall Hall	May 12, 1976 (#76000152)	5 miles north of Maryland Routes 210 and 227; 38°41′06″N 77°05′55″W	Bryans Road	
19	Maxwell Hall		July 30, 1974 (#74000949)	East of Patuxent on Teagues Point Rd. 38°32′04″N 76°42′01″W	Patuxent	
20	McPherson's Purchase		January 3, 1985 (#85000019)	Maryland Route 227; 38°35′56″N 77°02′51″W	Pomfret	
21	Mount Air		December 22, 1978 (#78001453)	West of Faulkner off U.S. Route 301; 38°26′12″N 76°59′50″W	Faulkner	
22	Mount Aventine	Mount Aventine	April 18, 1996 (#94001328)	1.8 miles southwest of Bryans Road on the northwestern side of Chapman's Landing Rd. 38°37′04″N 77°07′03″W	Bryans Road	
23	Mt. Carmel Monastery	Mt. Carmel Monastery	December 4, 1973 (#73000913)	North of Port Tobacco on Mt. Carmel Rd. 38°33′21″N 77°00′01″W	Port Tobacco	
24	Moyaone Reserve Historic District	Moyaone Reserve Historic District	October 7, 2020 (#100005659)	Roughly bounded by Bryan Point Rd., Piscataway Park, Overlook Dr./Old Landing Rd., and Farmington Rd. West; 38°41′27″N 77°01′25″W	Bryans Road	
25	Oak Grove	Oak Grove	November 23, 1983 (#83003777)	Turkey Hill Rd. 38°35′10″N 76°59′10″W	La Plata	
26	Oakland		August 4, 1983 (#83002946)	Maryland Route 5; 38°33′30″N 76°48′40″W	Bryantown	
27	Pleasant Hill		December 8, 1997 (#97001449)	9205 Marshall's Corner Rd. 38°35′18″N 76°59′37″W	Pomfret	
28	Pomonkey Historic District		August 22, 2024 (#100010690)	Livingston and Metropolitan Church Roads; 38°37′00″N 77°04′26″W	Pomonkey	
29	Port Tobacco Historic District	Port Tobacco Historic District	August 4, 1989 (#79003911)	Off Maryland Route 6; 38°30′45″N 77°01′07″W	Port Tobacco	
30	Retreat	Retreat	June 28, 1988 (#88000222)	Maryland Route 484/Poor House Rd. and Maryland Route 6; 38°30′38″N 77°02′48″W	Port Tobacco	
31	Rich Hill	Rich Hill	November 12, 1975 (#75000885)	Northeast of Bel Alton on Bel Alton-Newtown Rd. 38°28′54″N 76°57′03″W	Bel Alton	
32	Rose Hill	Rose Hill	March 30, 1973 (#73000914)	Rose Hill Rd. 38°31′19″N 77°01′42″W	Port Tobacco	
33	Rosemary Lawn		April 16, 1992 (#92000380)	Fire Tower Rd. 38°29′29″N 77°06′17″W	Welcome	
34	Sarum	Sarum	August 13, 1974 (#74000948)	Southeast of Newport off Maryland Route 234; 38°24′19″N 76°53′42″W	Newport	
35	St. Catharine	St. Catharine	October 1, 1974 (#74000950)	East of Waldorf near the junction of Maryland Routes 232 and 382; 38°36′34″N 76°49′36″W	Waldorf	
36	St. Mary's Roman Catholic Church, Newport	St. Mary's Roman Catholic Church, Newport	May 30, 1991 (#91000603)	St. Mary's Church Rd. 38°25′53″N 76°54′23″W	Newport	
37	St. Thomas Manor	St. Thomas Manor	November 10, 1988 (#88002050)	Maryland Route 427/Chapel Point Rd. 38°27′55″N 77°01′27″W	Port Tobacco	
38	Spye Park		October 4, 1990 (#90001523)	Padgett Road; 38°35′34″N 76°57′17″W	White Plains	
39	Stagg Hall	Stagg Hall	December 29, 1988 (#88003061)	County Route 469/Chapel Point Rd. 38°30′42″N 77°01′11″W	Port Tobacco	
40	Thainston	Thainston	March 28, 1990 (#90000436)	Mitchell Rd., north of Maryland Route 225; 38°34′06″N 77°00′35″W	La Plata	
41	Timber Neck Farm	Timber Neck Farm	September 6, 1979 (#79001123)	Southeast of Faulkner Rd. 38°25′52″N 76°57′08″W	Faulkner	
42	Truman's Place		January 20, 1988 (#87002264)	Gallant Green Rd. 38°33′58″N 76°46′41″W	Hughesville	
43	Waverley	Waverley	August 11, 1975 (#75000886)	13535 Waverly Point Road; 38°20′19″N 76°57′36″W	Morgantown	

== Formerly listed in the county ==
	Name on the Register	Image	Date listed	Date removed	Location	City or town	Description
1	Johnsontown		May 31, 1991 (#91000610)	May 11, 2006	Fairgrounds Rd. E of Penn Central RR tracks	Waldorf	Destroyed by fire on May 31, 2005.
2	Widow's Pleasure		April 18, 1991 (#89000664)	August 8, 2007	Piney Church Rd. 38°34′50″N 76°47′38″W	Waldorf	

== See also ==
- List of National Historic Landmarks in Maryland
- National Register of Historic Places listings in Maryland
