= Maryland Route 488 =

State highway in Maryland, United States

Maryland Route 488
- La Plata Road
- Map of Southern Maryland with MD 488 highlighted in red

Route information
- Maintained by MDSHA
- Length: 6.01 mi (9.67 km)
- Existed: 1933–present

Major junctions
- West end: MD 6 in La Plata
- East end: MD 5 near Bryantown

Location
- Country: United States
- State: Maryland
- Counties: Charles

Highway system
- Maryland highway system; Interstate; US; State; Scenic Byways
← MD 485	→ MD 489

Maryland Route 488 (MD 488) is a state highway in the U.S. state of Maryland. Known as La Plata Road, the state highway runs 6.01 miles (9.67 km) from MD 6 in La Plata east to MD 5 near Bryantown. MD 488 is a connector between La Plata and eastern Charles County, including the town of Hughesville. The state highway was constructed in the mid-1930s.

== Route description ==
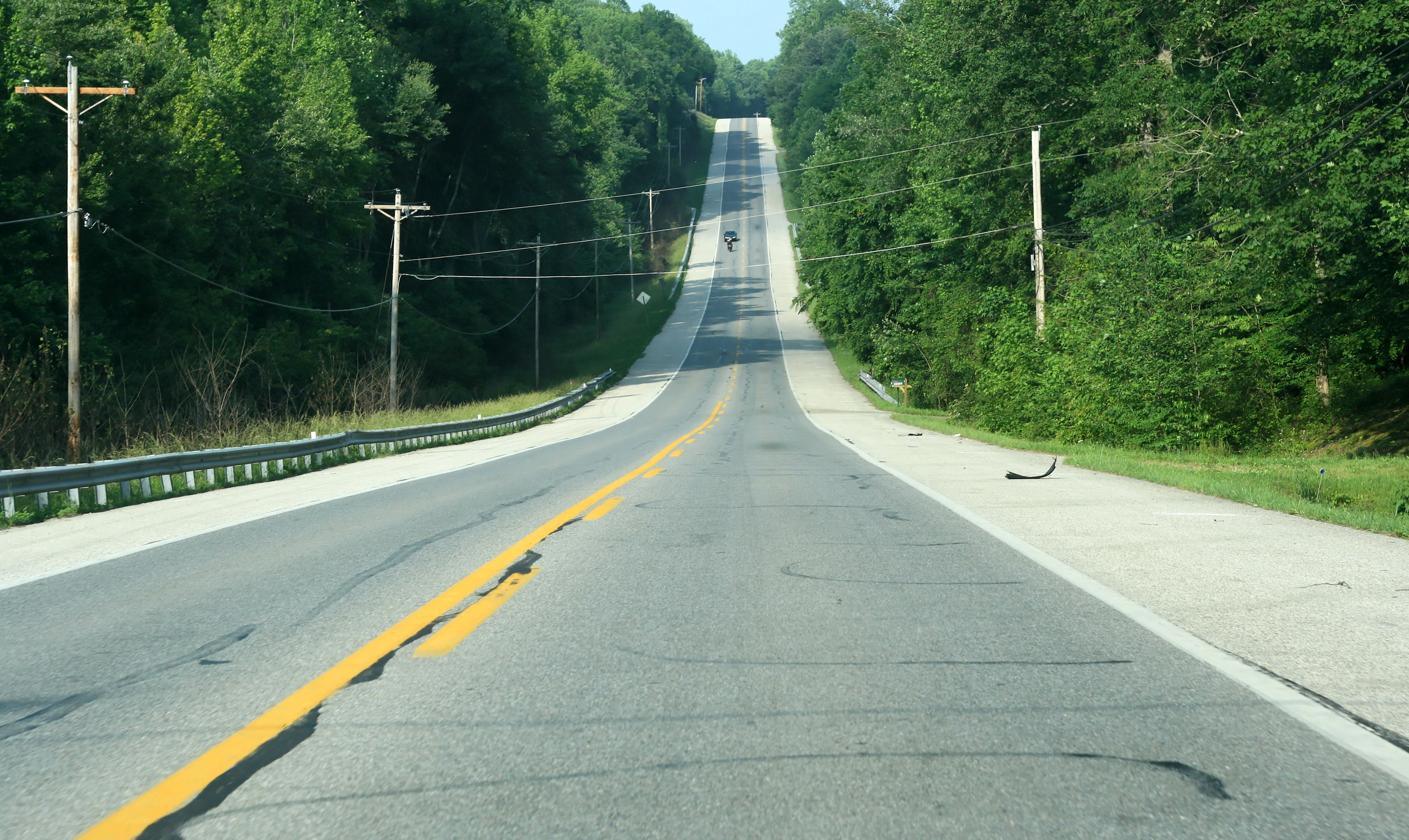
MD 488 begins a gradual downward slope to cross over the Kerrick Swamp.

MD 488 begins at an intersection with MD 6 (Charles Street) in the town of La Plata. The state highway heads northeast as a two-lane undivided road, passing Radio Station Road, which leads to Laurel Springs Regional Park and La Plata High School. MD 488 leaves La Plata and enters a forested area in which the highway crosses Kerrick Swamp and intersects Piney Church Road, which heads north toward Regency Furniture Stadium, home of the Southern Maryland Blue Crabs of the Atlantic League of Professional Baseball and St. Charles High School. The state highway passes the historic home The Lindens and crosses Piney Branch—a tributary of the Zekiah Swamp, which parallels the highway to the southeast—before reaching its eastern terminus at a directional crossover intersection with MD 5 (Leonardtown Road) west of Bryantown.

== History ==
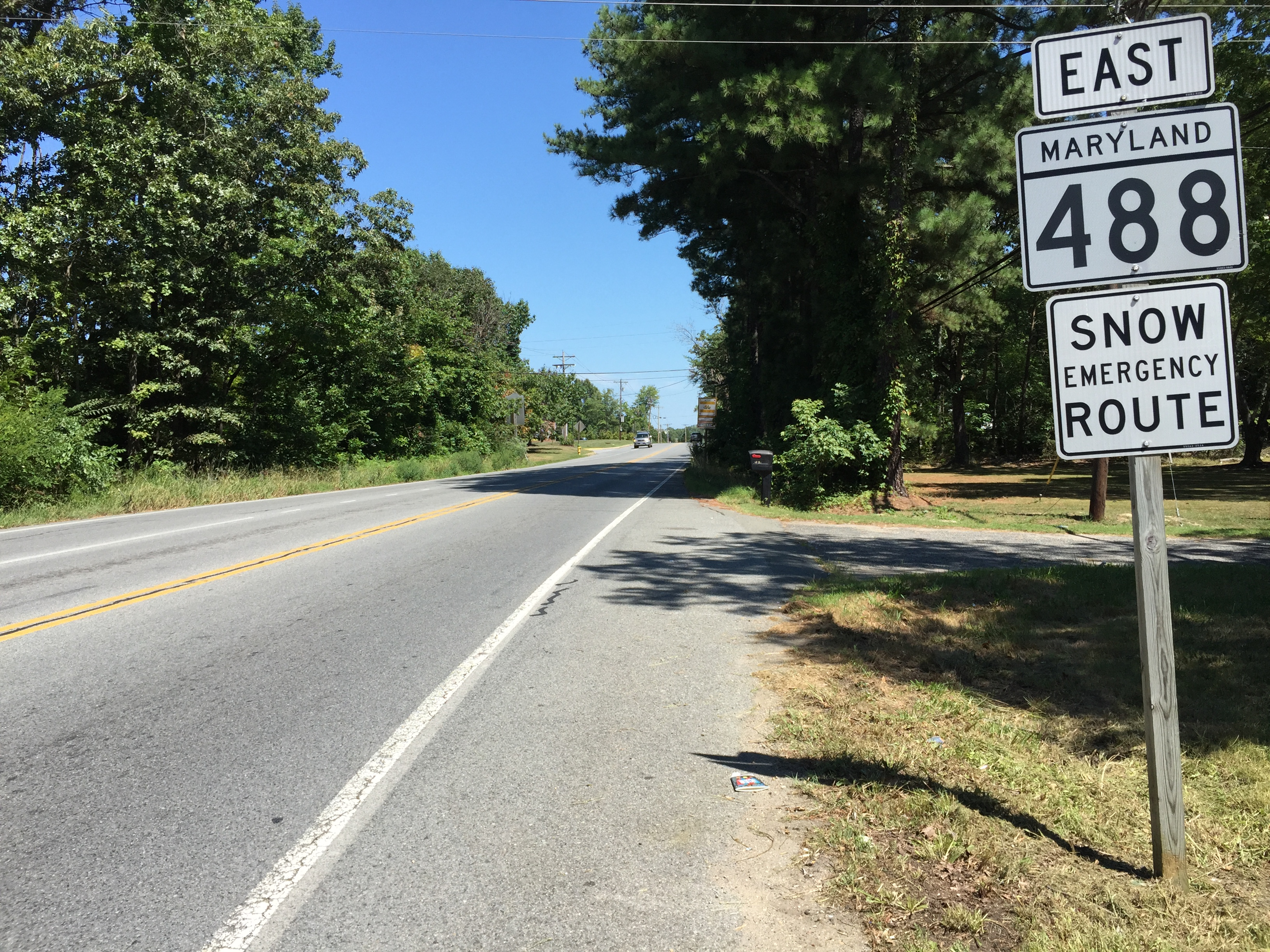
View east at the west end of MD 488 at MD 6 in La Plata

MD 488 was constructed in four sections starting from the La Plata end. The two sections from MD 6 to the La Plata town limits and from there across Kerrick Swamp to near Piney Church Road were built in 1933. The third section, extending from Piney Church Road to near Piney Branch, was constructed in 1934 and 1935. The final section, over Piney Branch to MD 5, was completed by 1938. Aside from minor improvements, MD 488 has changed very little from the 1930s.

== Junction list ==
The entire route is in Charles County.

Location	mi	km	Destinations	Notes
La Plata	0.00	0.00	MD 6 (Charles Street) – Charlotte Hall, Port Tobacco	Western terminus
Bryantown	6.01	9.67	MD 5 (Leonardtown Road) – Waldorf, Hughesville	Eastern terminus
1.000 mi = 1.609 km; 1.000 km = 0.621 mi
