= 2002 Big League World Series =

Tournament details
- Country: United States
- City: Easley, South Carolina
- Dates: 3–10 August 2002
- Teams: 10

Final positions
- Champions: San Juan, Puerto Rico
- Runner-up: Hughesville, Maryland

The 2002 Big League World Series took place from August 3–10 in Easley, South Carolina, United States. San Juan, Puerto Rico defeated Hughesville, Maryland in the championship game.

A mixed-pool format was introduced this year.

== Teams ==
United States	International
(South Carolina) Easley, South Carolina; District 1 Host	(Philippines) Makati, Philippines Asia–Pacific
(Indiana) Jeffersonville, Indiana; District 5 Central	The Maritimes, Nova Scotia, Canada; Cape Breton; Canada
(Maryland) Hughesville, Maryland; District 7 East	(Germany) Germany Europe
Virginia Beach, Virginia; District 8 Southeast	(Puerto Rico) San Juan, Puerto Rico Latin America
(Louisiana) Ruston, Louisiana; Lincoln Parish; Southwest	
(Washington (state)) Auburn, Washington; District 10; West

== Results ==
Group A

Team	W	L	Rs	Ra
South Carolina	3	1	56	6
Maryland	3	1	23	8
Indiana	3	1	29	25
Germany	1	3	20	46
Philippines	0	4	3	60

	(Germany)	(Indiana)	(Maryland)	(Philippines)	(South Carolina)
Germany	–	5–8	0–10	15–3	0–13
Indiana	8–5	–	6–0	12–7	3–13
Maryland	10–0	0–6	–	10–0	3–2
Philippines	3–15	7–12	0–10	–	0–28
South Carolina	13–0	13–3	2–3	28–0	–

Group B

Team	W	L	Rs	Ra
Virginia	4	0	24	14
Puerto Rico	3	1	33	14
Louisiana	2	2	27	29
(Washington (state)) Washington	1	3	21	29
Canada	0	4	11	30

	(Canada)	(Louisiana)	(Puerto Rico)	(Virginia)	(Washington (state))
Canada	–	1–9	5–10	3–5	2–6
Louisiana	9–1	–	1–11	7–8	10–9
Puerto Rico	10–5	11–1	–	0–6	12–2
Virginia	5–3	8–7	6–0	–	5–4
Washington (Washington (state))	6–2	9–10	2–12	4–5	–

Elimination Round

Semifinals
4–0	Virginia	3
3–1	Maryland	6
3–1	South Carolina	5
3–1	Puerto Rico	9

World Championship
4–1	Maryland	2
4–1	Puerto Rico	7

2002 Big League World Series Champions
San Juan, Puerto Rico
