= McConchie One-Room School =

Former racially-segregated school in Welcome, Maryland

Coordinates: 38°28′52″N 76°59′08″W

The McConchie One-Room School was a one-room school in Welcome, Maryland, that served Black children from grades 1 to 7.

== History ==
It was open from 1912 to 1952 at Route 6 and Point Blossom Road in Welcome, Maryland. Edna Warren Simmons served as a teacher from 1922, when she was hired as a short-term substitute, until a few years prior to the closure. It closed in 1952 due to a consolidation of Negro schools with those of nearby Port Tobacco, Maryland.

The school and property were bought by a private citizen and were a family rental property, but the schoolhouse was abandoned by 1980. After the property was planned for demolition in 1992, several Charles County Fair board members, including Mitchell Digges and George Dyson, spearheaded a move to the Charles County Fairgrounds. Simmons was present at the dedication ceremony after it was moved to the fairgrounds.

== Current status ==
The school is just inside the entrance to the Charles County Fairgrounds; it serves as a living museum and is open for tours on the Fourth of July, for three days in December during the "Kris Kringle Christmas Market", and by request of the public. It has been awarded a grant by the Maryland Historical Trust, African American Heritage Preservation Program, for renovation in 2020.
