= Acquinsicke =

Historic house in Maryland

- U.S. National Register of Historic Places
- Location within Maryland Location within the United States
- Nearest city: Pomfret, Maryland
- Coordinates: 38°36′30″N 77°2′14″W
- Area: 15.2 acres (62,000 m^{2})
- Architectural style: Federal
- NRHP reference No.: 92000070
- Added to NRHP: February 20, 1992

Acquinsicke is a historic home located near Pomfret, Charles County, Maryland, United States. It was built between 1783 and 1798, is a highly significant example of late 18th century, early Federal architecture. It is a rectangular, two story, five bay, clapboarded frame dwelling with one-story additions to each end. The house's landscape features include a series of two terraced falls.

== History ==
Acquinsicke takes its name from a 1,000-acre (4 km^{2}) tract of escheat land patented by Anthony Neale in 1704. Originally known as White's Ford and renamed Acquinsicke by Neale, the 1,000 acres (4 km^{2}) had formerly been granted to Jerome White in 1669. White had immigrated to Maryland from England as a free adult about 1661. A Catholic, apparently well educated, he held a number of important and influential positions, including that of deputy governor in 1669 and the colony's Surveyor General, 1661–1671. White received land grants totaling more than 1,000 acres (4 km^{2}) — most of which reverted to the Lords Baltimore when White died in England intestate and without heirs in 1677. The White's Ford grc: of 1,000 acres (4 km^{2}) was one of those that es cheated to the proprietor. When the tract was resurveyed for Anthony Neale the boundaries were found to embrace 572 acres (2.3 km^{2}) more than the 1,000 acres (4 km^{2}) stipulated in White's grant. To correct this discrepancy. Neale was requested to " ... leave out the surplus age where [he] should think convenient . .. " The origin of the name Anthony Neale gave to the property is not precisely known. It is known to have derived from a word or descriptive term used by Native Americans who continued to occupy this section of Charles County at the time that Neale patented the property. It may even have been the name of a small village that once existed on or near the land.

Anthony Neale's patent was recorded in 1706 and it was probably not long afterward that he established Acquinsicke as his dwelling plantation. Previous to that time he is believed to have lived on part of his father's plantation, Wollaston Manor, in the southeastern section of the county. Neale's father, Capt. James Neale, was a highly educated and well-travelled member of colonial Maryland society. He first arrived in Maryland in 1635 but did not establish formal residence in the colony until 1642 . A planter and assemblyman. James Neale held a number of provincial offices, and between 1649 and 1659 served as ambassador for Charles II and the Duke of York in Spain and Portugal. The Neales were staunch Roman Catholics and continued to be openly so throughout the 1691–1776 period when Catholics in Maryland were denied their basic civil rights. Anthony Neale's parents and their descendants established and supported a private mission at Wollaston Manor, and Anthony Neale is said to have supported the work of the Church by providing his home at Acquinsicke Society of Jesus headquartered at as a mission chapel of the St. Thomas Manor (CH-6;NR).

Anthony Neale died in 1723. His will devised one-half of the Acquinsicke plantation to his son Edward stipulating that "...it be that moiety whereon my dwelling house stands that I now live in." Edward was also given "...my silver Chalice & suit[e] of Church Stuff to be kept and remained in my said Dwelling House and to go from heir to heir for the use of our family etc. so long as any of mine shall inhabit in the said place." Edward's share of Acquinsicke was to lie south of and include the dwelling; his brother, Charles, was bequeathed the part of the plantation lying north of the dwelling together with "...one thousand foot of one inch pine plank to be used towards ... building him a house ..."

By the standards of the period, Neale clearly enjoyed a privileged lifestyle, despite the fact that the inventory of his personality suggested that his house was probably of only two rooms with small sleeping chamber above. Although he did own a "house clock, a small library of books. assorted pieces of silver, a violin and 5 packs of playing cards", his house was as modestly furnished as it was small. Nevertheless, this was true of nearly all dwellings occupied by those of Neale's stature. The estate, which included 33 slaves, was estimated to be worth over 1.108 pounds sterling, placing Neale among the county's wealthier inhabitants. Neale also owned several other valuable properties, including a mill seat and two unimproved lots in Chandlers Town (Port Tobacco;NR) in the same county.

Edward Neale was probably living at the home plantation at the time of his father's death, and is known to have continued to reside there until the mid-1740s when he moved to Queen Anne's County on Maryland's Eastern Shore. According to several local histories, Acquinsicke continued to be used as a place of worship for local Catholics throughout Neale's occupation of the land. In 1751 Edward Neale, who had no surviving sons, conveyed the 500 acres (2 km^{2}) of Acquinsicke he had inherited from his father, plus an additional contiguous tract of 611 acres (2.5 km^{2}) he patented under the name Acquinsicke Enlarged to his eldest daughter Eleanor and her husband Henry Rozer of Prince George's County. Eleanor and Henry Rozer were then living at Notley Hall, a large estate binding on the Potomac River near present-day Fort Washington which Henry had inherited from his father Notley Rozer. Seven years later Charles Neale, Edward's brother, sold his half share of Acquinsicke to Col. Samuel Hanson necessitating a formally surveyed division of the two parts of the original tract they had inherited on their father's death in 1723.

== Historical context ==
Acquinsicke was built in the last two decades of the 18th century, a very important time of transition in the development of domestic architecture in Southern Maryland. From about 1720 until the end of the American Revolution housing forms in Southern Maryland were fairly unchanged- homes of the middle and lower economic classes were usually one-story with one or two lower rooms and small attic chambers above, while those of the more prosperous merchant planters almost invariably contained four rooms off a centered rear stair hall and with bed chambers within a gable or gambrel roof. Surviving buildings combined with historical research has provided convincing evidence that houses with central through passages and houses of a full two-story height were relatively rare before the close of the 18th century. It was not until about the second decade of the 19th century, when improved economic conditions spawned a building boom that continued well into the 1840s, that two-story dwellings with central or side passages extending the full depth of the house became increasingly common. Similarly, changing fashions in a broader American context was slow to influence local architectural trends.

Consequently, there are remarkably few late-18th-century houses in Charles County whose architectural embellishments reflect to any significant degree the neoclassicism so widely embraced elsewhere in the decades following the Revolutionary War. The land on which Acquinsicke stands is part of what was once one of Charles County's largest plantations and was initially established by Anthony Neale, member of one of Maryland's most historically important Catholic families. Neale's dwelling, which is believed to have stood on or near the site of the present house, was used as both a private residence and as a mission chapel of the Society of Jesus headquartered at St. Thomas Manor INRI. The survival and growth of Catholicism in Maryland during the 1690–1116 period was almost entirely dependent on the support of these mission chapels by families such as the Neales. All of these mission chapels have disappeared, and the precise locations of nearly all of them remain unknown. Today, only St. Thomas Manor and the property encompassing St. Mary's Church, Newport INRI have documented associations with the pre-1776 history of Roman Catholicism in this area, and Acquinsicke is the only extant non-church owned site to have historically proven associations with the missionary activities of the society of Jesus in this locality .

Aquinsicke is currently privately owned.

== Impact ==
Acquinsicke is a very significant example of late 18th century, early Federal architecture. Remarkably, only a few examples of domestic architectural farms survive in this region that illustrate as well as Acquinsicke the transitional phase between entirely vernacular building traditions, and those buildings whose overall designs and carpentry were influenced by outside sources. In this sense, Acquinsicke's full two-story height, one-room-deep design, finished and heated attic chambers, and intrepidly corbelled and plaster banded chimney stacks are of specific note. Viewed independently, each of these details is unique in a late 18th-century architectural context; Together, they establish Acquinsicke as entirely matchless.

Acquinsicke is also of significance for the historical connection of the site it occupies with the history of Roman Catholicism in Southern Maryland. There is compelling historical evidence that the house rests on or immediately next to the site of an earlier structure that from about 1706 until at least the middle of that century served the dual function of private home and mission chapel served by Jesuits headquartered at St. Thomas Manor. Acquinsicke is one of only three sites in Charles County with documented affiliations with the pastoral activities of the Roman Catholic Church during the 1690–1776 period when Catholics in Maryland were denied their basic civil rights.
