= Pomfret, Maryland =

- Census-designated place, unincorporated community
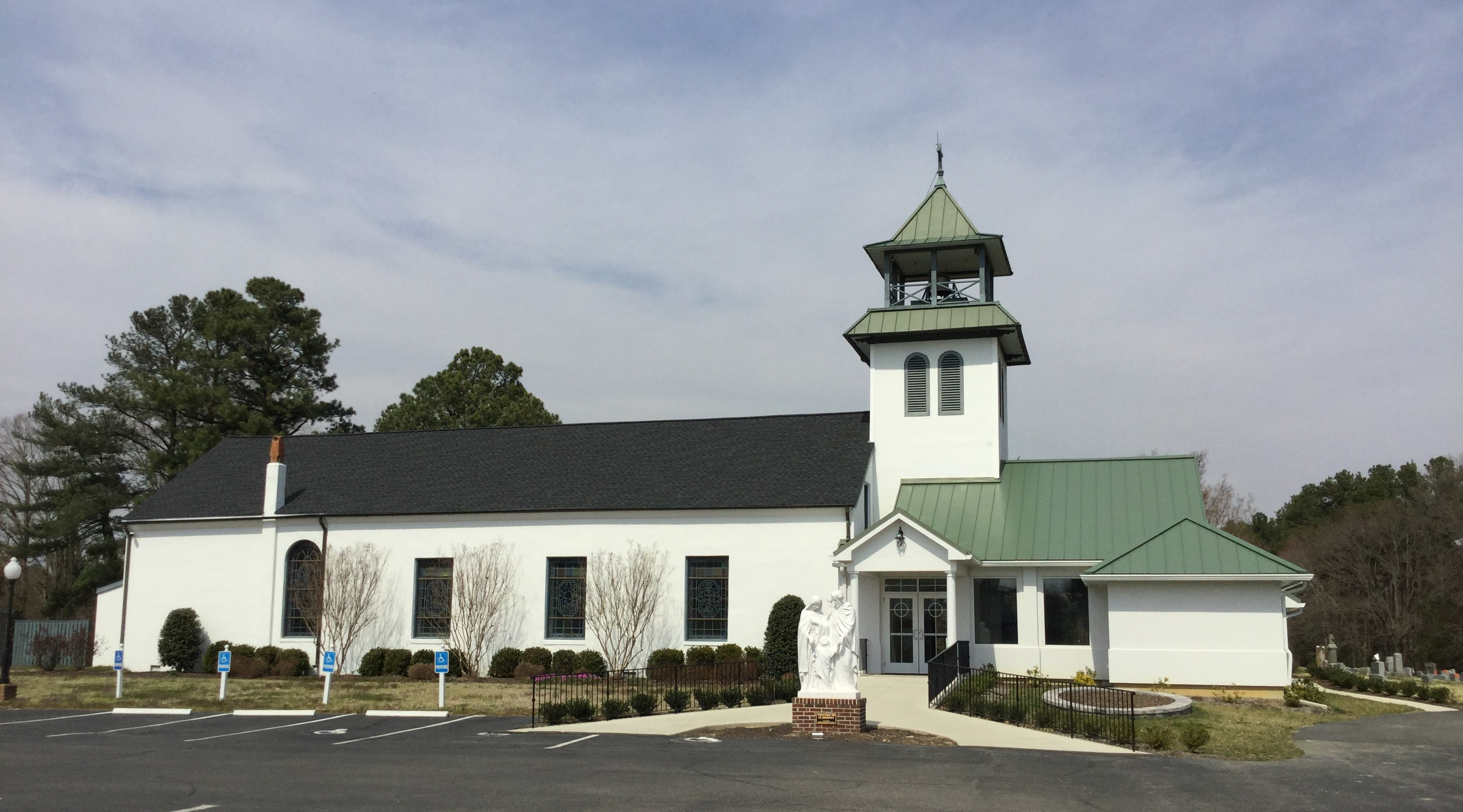
- St Joseph Catholic Church, in Pomfret, MD. Built in 1849, founding of parish, 1763.

- Location within the state of Maryland Pomfret (the United States)
- Coordinates: 38°34′38″N 77°1′53″W
- Country: United States
- State: Maryland
- County: Charles
- Established: At least by 1713

Government
  - Type: Unincorporated, Charles County administrates

Area
  - Total: 2.74 sq mi (7.10 km^{2})
  - Land: 2.74 sq mi (7.10 km^{2})
  - Water: 0 sq mi (0.00 km^{2})
- Elevation: 126 ft (38 m)

Population (2020)
  - Total: 514
  - Density: 187.6/sq mi (72.43/km^{2})
- Time zone: UTC−5 (Eastern (EST))
  - Summer (DST): UTC−4 (EDT)
- ZIP code: 20675
- FIPS code: 24-62675
- GNIS feature ID: 586631

Pomfret is a census-designated place in Charles County, Maryland, United States. As of the 2020 census, it had a population of 514. There are five properties in the area that are on the National Register of Historic Places. The origins of the settlement go back to at least 1666.

Pomfret is located in central Charles county on Marshall Corner Road part of which is also Route 227. It is one mile west of the College of Southern Maryland and three fifths of a mile south of Bennsville Park.

== History and places ==
A house was built in what is now Pomfret by Francis Caleb Green, on part of the 2,400 acres (970 ha) of land granted in 1666 to the sons of Thomas Greene, the second Provincial Governor of Maryland, who named it "Green's Inheritance". Mother Catherine Spalding, born in 1793, was a native of Pomfret, according to a brass plaque inside the front entrance to St. Joseph's. The active historic St. Joseph's Catholic Church was established by Father George Hunter, S.J. in Pomfret in 1763. The current structure dates from 1849.

Acquinsicke, Green's Inheritance, McPherson's Purchase and Pleasant Hill are all listed on the National Register of Historic Places.

The Pomfret Colored School, a segregated all-black school house, operated from the 1920s to the 1950s. It is located on 5495 Hole Shot Place and is under domestic use.

=== Book ===
In 1963, the nonfiction book "History of Saint Joseph's Church, Pomfret, Maryland, 1763-1963 [200th anniversary]" was published. It was written by Hester Virginia Mudd.

=== 2022 exotic snake venom incident ===
On January 19, 2022, Pomfret resident David Riston was found dead with 124 snakes in his house. Many of the snakes were exotic species including some of the most deadly snakes in the world, including cobras and black mambas as well as rattlesnakes and a 14 foot long Burmese python which is not a venomous species, but at that size was a dangerous constrictor. On April 14, 2022, the Maryland State Medical Examiners Office announced, after an autopsy, that Riston had died of "snake envenomation". Some of the snakes in the house were illegal to own, either in Maryland or the United States as a whole.

=== First production of an International cassette tape ministry ===
This nonprofit company operated on the grounds of St. Joseph's Parish, Pomfret, Maryland. This was the first production of a worldwide cassette tape ministry. In September 1974, the Catholic Archbishop of Washington asked Fulton Sheen to be the speaker for a retreat for diocesan priests at the Loyola Retreat House in Faulkner, Maryland. This was first recorded on reel-to-reel tape, state of the art at the time, then it was transferred to cassette tapes.

Sheen requested that the recorded talks be produced for distribution. It was called Ministry-O-Media. The retreat album was titled, Renewal and Reconciliation and included nine 60-minute audiotapes. All tapes were produced in Pomfret.

=== Station 13 Dive Rescue and Recovery Team ===
Station 13 in Pomfret houses Charles County Dive Rescue Company 13, which provides underwater rescue and recovery services related to drowning or crime victims in waters of the county and surrounding jurisdictions, as well as assisting with fast water rescue during floods. The Team also provides public education on water safety and ice fall-through safety. Station 13 does not provide fire protection or emergency medical services to the immediate Pomfret community. It was built in Pomfret in 2009.

== Schools ==
Charles County Public Schools is the area school district.

Maurice J. McDonough High School is located at the south end of the CDP, just north of Maryland Route 225.

Dr. James Craik Elementary School is located in Pomfret.

The Robert D. Stethem Educational Center is located in Pomfret. It is an alternative public school for grades 6 through 12.

The College of Southern Maryland is one mile due east of Pomfret.

== Demographics ==
Historical population
Census	Pop.	Note	%±
2010	517		—
2020	514		−0.6%
U.S. Decennial Census; 2010 2020

Pomfret first appeared as a census designated place in the 2010 U.S. census.

=== 2020 census ===
Pomfret CDP, Maryland – Racial and ethnic composition Note: the US Census treats Hispanic/Latino as an ethnic category. This table excludes Latinos from the racial categories and assigns them to a separate category. Hispanics/Latinos may be of any race.
Race / Ethnicity (NH = Non-Hispanic)	Pop 2010	Pop 2020	% 2010	% 2020
White alone (NH)	186	161	35.98%	31.32%
Black or African American alone (NH)	260	244	50.29%	47.47%
Native American or Alaska Native alone (NH)	43	33	8.32%	6.42%
Asian alone (NH)	3	1	0.58%	0.19%
Native Hawaiian or Pacific Islander alone (NH)	0	1	0.00%	0.19%
Other race alone (NH)	0	2	0.00%	0.39%
Mixed race or Multiracial (NH)	19	36	3.68%	7.00%
Hispanic or Latino (any race)	6	36	1.16%	7.00%
Total	517	514	100.00%	100.00%

In a different part of the 2020 US Census results, the reported ethnic ancestry of residents was 50% Black or African American; 10.1% German, 7% Hispanic or Latino; 6.4% Native American 6.1% Irish, and 4% Polish and .58% Asian or Filipino.

Veterans, percentage of population: Male - 12.9%; Female - 7.7%.

Educational level—High school or equivalent degree - 25.1%; some college - 10.3%; Associate degree - 11.2%; Bachelor's degree 26.5%; Graduate or professional degree - 18.2%.

Income—Median household income - $99,096. Rate of poverty - 7.8%.

Age—Under 18 - 5.8%; 18 and over - 94.2%; 65 and over - 65.3%.

Heads of household—Married couples - 22.6%; single fathers - 22.6%; single mothers - 47.7%.

Occupations—Working for a private company - 51.5%; private not-for-profit workers - 26.8%; Local, State or Federal Government workers - 16.2%; Educational services - health care and social assistance - 48.1%.

== Notable people ==
- Larry Johnson, American football coach
- Larry Johnson Jr., American football player
