= St. Mary's Catholic Church (Bryantown, Maryland) =

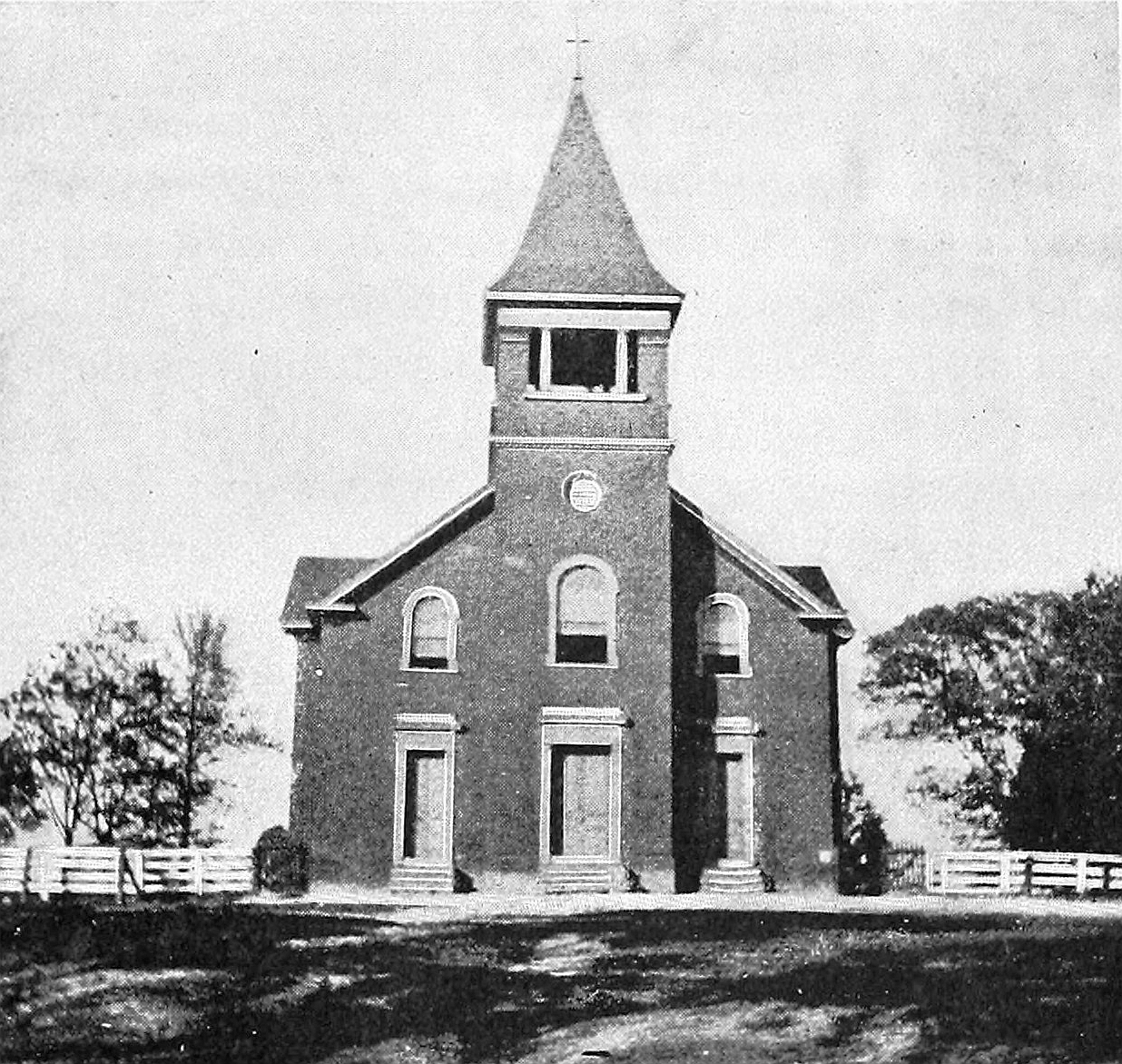
- St. Mary's Catholic Church, 1901

- Location in Maryland
- 38°32′22″N 76°50′13″W
- Location: 13715 Notre Dame Place, Bryantown, Maryland
- Country: United States
- Denomination: Roman Catholic
- Website: www.stmarysbryantown.com

History
- Status: Church
- Founded: 1793

Clergy
- Pastor: Rory T. Conley

St. Mary's Catholic Church is a parish of the Roman Catholic Church located near Bryantown, Maryland, in the Roman Catholic Archdiocese of Washington. Established in 1793, it operates a parochial school and houses a large cemetery. St. Mary's Cemetery is most notably the final resting spot of Dr. Samuel Mudd, a physician who set the leg of John Wilkes Booth the day after U.S. President Lincoln's assassination on April 14, 1865. As such, it is a stop on the Booth's Escape Scenic Byway. Booth had previously attended a Mass on November 13, 1864 with several of his associates and later conspirators, where he was introducted to Dr. Mudd.

Although Catholic worship in Bryantown was recorded as early as 1654, land for a log cabin church was not set aside until 1743. Construction on the current church began in 1846. It was damaged by fire in 1963, rebuilt, and rededicated in 1966.
