= John Henry Alexander =

American lawyer, civil engineer, surveyor, geologist, and university teacher

- Born: June 26, 1812; Annapolis
- Died: March 2, 1867 (aged 54); Baltimore
- Education: St. John's College
- Occupation: Educator, civil engineer, businessperson, author
- Employer: St. John's College; University of Maryland; University of Pennsylvania
- Spouse(s): Margaret Hammer (m. 1836)
- Children: Kathleen Hannah Murray Alexander
- Parent(s): John Alexander; Hannah Richardson Murray
- Position held: engineer (1834–1841)

John Henry Alexander (June 26, 1812 – March 2, 1867) was an American scientist, civil engineer and businessman.

== Personal life ==
Alexander was born in Annapolis, Maryland, on June 26, 1812. The youngest child of William and Mary (Harwood Stockett) Alexander. His education was acquired in his native city, he was graduated from St. John's College in 1826, and he spent the next four years reading law privately, but apparently he did not take the bar exam. He, instead, chose to begin working for the Baltimore and Susquehanna Railroad, later part of the Northern Central. Alexander also attended medical lectures in Baltimore, though he did not receive a degree in Medicine.

Alexander married Margaret Hammer on June 4, 1836, in Baltimore. They had at least two sons, the second one born in Baltimore in October 1838. Throughout his life Alexander maintained close ties with his older brothers, William (born circa 1803) and Thomas Stockett (born 1801). The brothers shared a deep devotion to the Whig party, and William often sent Alexander detailed accounts of the actions of the House of Delegates in Annapolis.

Alexander was active in the congregation of St. Luke's Episcopal Church in Baltimore, and wrote a concordance to the Book of Common Prayer as well as two volumes of religious poetry.

== Business experience ==
As part of his work for the Baltimore and Susquehanna railroad, Alexander performed surveys and made maps of the route. This experience, combined with his academic achievements, led to Alexander's 1833 appointment as the Chief Engineer of Maryland. He was charged with the task of creating a complete map of Maryland. While carrying out his surveys for this task, Alexander located several canal route proposals including Zekiah Swamp and the richest coal deposits in the state. Frustrated with needing to divert his mapping assignment for internal improvement projects, he resigned from his position as Maryland's official cartographer. He then joined with a friend, P.T. Tyson, Esq., to found the George's Creek Iron and Coal Company. By the time Alexander resigned his state position in 1837, the company's success had made him financially secure.

As topographical engineer of Maryland, to which office he was appointed in 1834, he made a survey of the state in connection with the geological survey, and until 1841 prepared the annual reports, which prompted the opening of valuable coal and iron mines.

== Professional titles ==
Alexander held a wide variety of professional appointments over his lifetime. He served as Chief Cartographer of Maryland, geologist of Maryland, and in 1857 was appointed Commissioner to England to work on creating an international system of weights and measures. Alexander also was professor of civil engineering at the University of Pennsylvania and professor of physics at the University of Maryland.

== Notable works ==
He published a number of works including his report on a new map of Maryland (1835), a treatise on international coinage of Great Britain and the United States (1857) and an opinion on the location of the Baltimore and Ohio Railroad in Wheeling, Virginia (1850). He edited a treatise on leveling and Sims' treatise on mathematical instruments (1838), used in surveying, leveling, and astronomy (1835). He was a fellow of the American Philosophical Society, and a member of the Geographical and Statistical Society and the Maryland and Pennsylvania Historical Societies. In 1847, he was elected an honorable member of the Belle Lettres Society at the College of St. James in Hagerstown, Maryland.

He died in Baltimore on March 2, 1867, and left an unpublished manuscript for A Dictionary of English Surnames (12 volumes, 8 vo), William Pinkney wrote his life published in 1867, and J. E. Hilgard, a memoir published in the 1st volume of Biographical Memoirs of the National Academy of Sciences.
