= Oakland (Bryantown, Maryland) =

Historic house in Maryland, United States

- U.S. National Register of Historic Places
- Location within Maryland Location within the United States
- Location: Maryland Route 5, Bryantown, Maryland
- Coordinates: 38°33′30″N 76°48′40″W
- Area: 1 acre (0.40 ha)
- Built: 1823
- Built by: Morton, George
- Architectural style: Federal
- NRHP reference No.: 83002946
- Added to NRHP: August 4, 1983

Oakland is a historic home located near Bryantown, Charles County, Maryland, United States. It is a two-story, three-bay brick dwelling constructed in the Federal style between 1822 and 1823. About 1880, the Greek Revival entrance and the Italianate front porch were constructed.

It was listed on the National Register of Historic Places in 1983.
