= White's Ford =

Crossing over the Potomac River during the American Civil War

Coordinates: 39.191°N 77.476°W

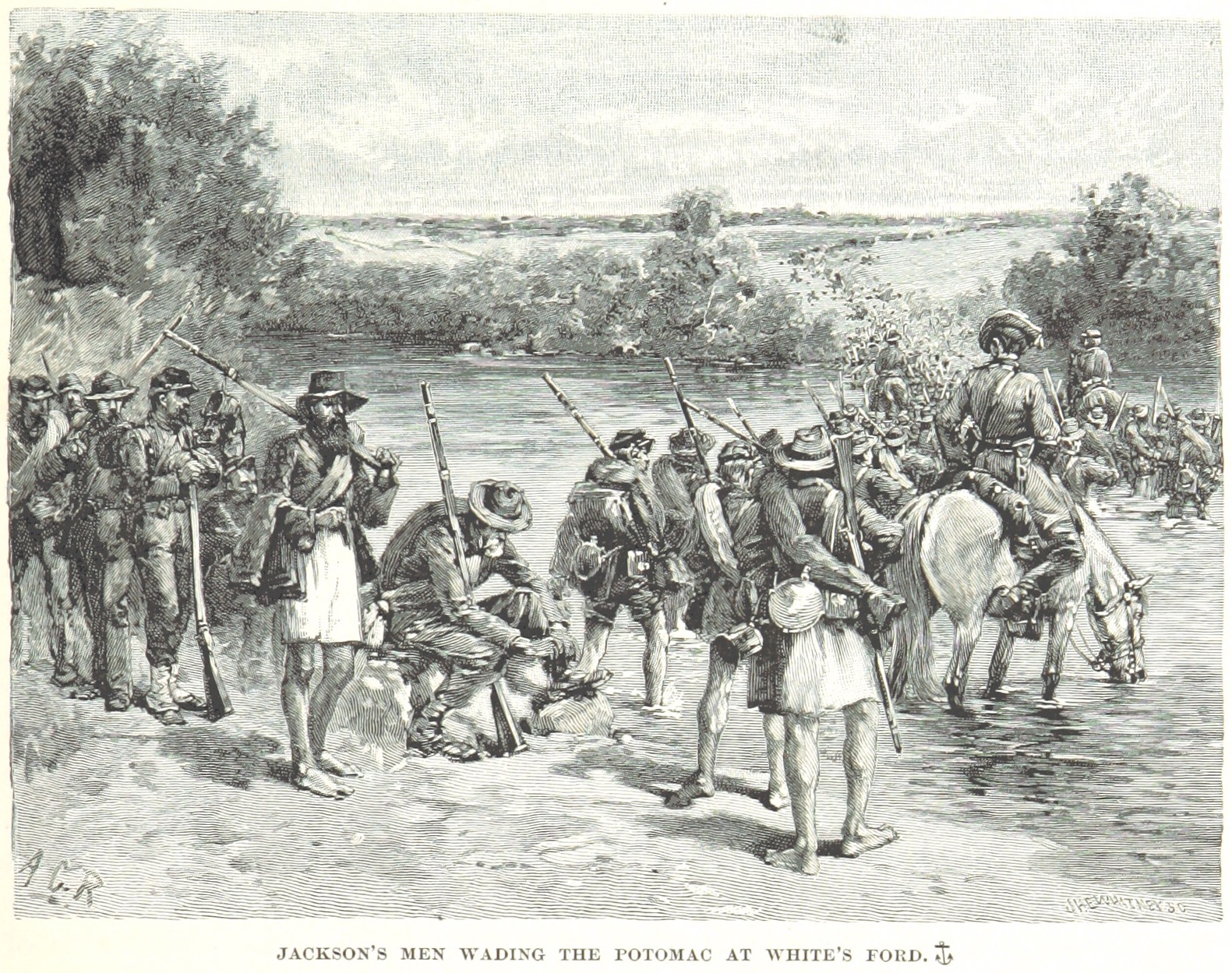
Stonewall Jackson's troops crossing the Potomac at White's Ford in 1862

White's Ford was an important ford over the Potomac River during the American Civil War. It was used in many major actions, including the crossing into Maryland of the Confederate army prior to the Maryland Campaign and Confederate Major General J.E.B. Stuart's ride around Union Major General George B. McClellan on October 10, 1862, when he used the ford to cross into Loudoun County, Virginia. It is located a few miles above present-day White's Ferry.

The ford was named after Captain Elijah V. White, a Confederate cavalry officer and leader of the cavalry battalion known as the Comanches. His farm was on the Virginia side of the ford.
