= Pleasant Hill (Pomfret, Maryland) =

Historic house in Maryland, United States

- U.S. National Register of Historic Places
- Location within Maryland Location within the United States
- Location: 9205 Marshall's Corner Rd., Pomfret, Maryland
- Coordinates: 38°35′18″N 76°59′37″W
- Area: 18 acres (7.3 ha)
- Built: 1760
- Architectural style: Southern Maryland House Type
- NRHP reference No.: 97001449
- Added to NRHP: December 8, 1997

Pleasant Hill is a historic home located near Pomfret, Charles County, Maryland, United States. It is a 2 1/2-story, three-bay Tidewater house constructed between 1761 and 1995. The house illustrates the characteristic pattern of homes from small one- and two-room 18th-century dwellings into the larger houses that survive today.

Pleasant Hill was listed on the National Register of Historic Places in 1997.

== History ==
The land on which Pleasant Hill is located was originally part of a larger tract known as Green's Inheritance. In 1713 John Spalding purchased 200 acres of Green's Inheritance for Pleasant Hill. The home was built in at least three phases.

- The first phase was begun in the 1760s by Basil Spalding, grandson of John. The original structure was a single story, two room home with a full cellar. It was made of timber framing with sawn clapboards. There were two chimneys on either end. The cellar was divided into two rooms, one of which had a fireplace and is believed to have been the original kitchen. A 20th century architectural historian described it as a typical middle-class home but "of better quality than most." Basil died in 1792 and left the home to his widow, Catherine.
- The second phase took place during Basil Jr.'s ownership. Sometime between 1798 and 1828 he added a two-room wing to the southeast end. The east-most room had a brick floor and a large fireplace, likely meaning this room became the new kitchen. Some commentators describe this wing as the oldest or original part of the home. But structural clues strongly suggest that it was built later. Basil Spalding, Jr. died in 1828 and his property was divided between his two sons in approximately 1838. His son John took Pleasant Hill.
- The third modification took place during John's ownership, between 1838 and 1848. During this time, John added a second floor to the original two-room portion of the house and the first room of Basil Jr.'s addition. John also added two-story porches to the front and back of the home along the length of the two-room main block. The front porch remains. The back porch is believed to have been demolished in the early 20th century after it became structurally unsound. During John's time at Pleasant Hill, he operated a store and post office from the property. The inventory of John's estate indicate that he was a slave-holder, owning 19 slaves. John died in 1848.
- This was the fourth phase in the construction of Pleasant Hill. From approximately 1992 to 1995, Don and Beth added a two-story wing to the west end of the house, consisting of a one-room basement, kitchen, and second-floor bedroom. The new wing was connected to the older portion of the house by a hyphen which connected to a new, glass-enclosed, two-story porch where the original porch had been located. They also added a separate garage and swimming pool. At this time, the older portion of the home was restored to its appearance in the mid-nineteenth century. Tom Shiner was the architect for the new wing and restoration. Don Rice, however, performed much of the woodwork himself.
