= Bryantown Historic District =

Historic district in Maryland, United States

- U.S. National Register of Historic Places
- U.S. Historic district
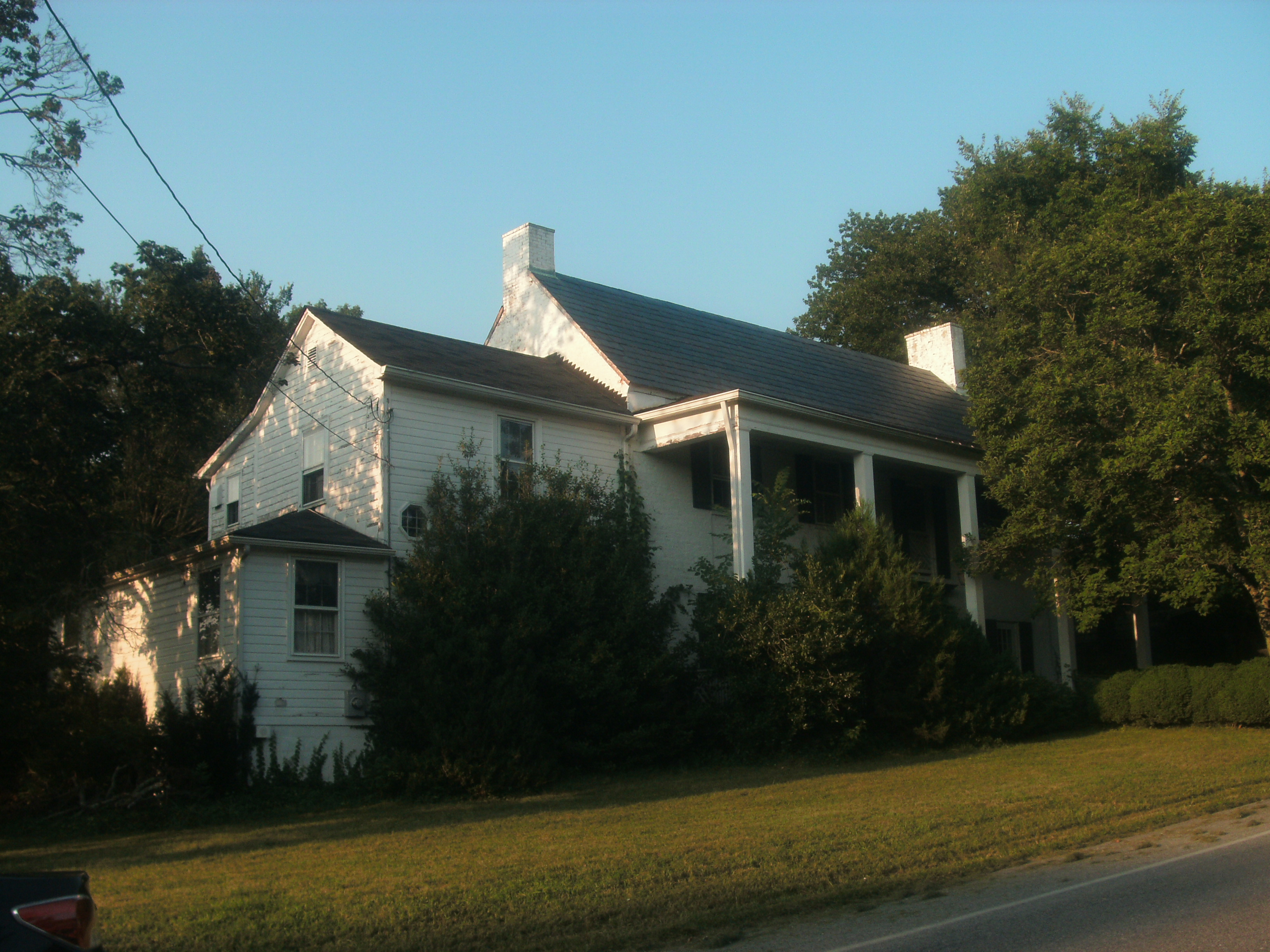

- Location within Maryland Location within the United States
- Location: MD 5 and County Rt. 232, Bryantown, Maryland
- Coordinates: 38°33′11″N 76°50′39″W
- Built: 1780
- Architectural style: Italianate, Federal
- NRHP reference No.: 85000590
- Added to NRHP: March 14, 1985

Bryantown Historic District is a national historic district in Bryantown, Charles County, Maryland. It consists of 19 contributing buildings, structures, and sites and five non-contributing buildings and structures. The nucleus of the district is a group of four 19th-century buildings flanking Old Route 5 west of the former crossroads. Included among these are two c. 1820 structures of major interest, the Bryantown Tavern and Brick House Lot. The latter is notable for its formal Federal design.

The two most physically prominent structures in Bryantown are Evergreen and the Smith House; both built near the turn of the 20th century. Evergreen is the finest example of Victorian Carpenter Gothic architecture in Charles County. Also built early in the 20th century are the John T. Mudd House and the Carrico House, both of which are two-story, three-bay dwellings architecturally typical of a rural community in this region. There are also two, two-story, gambrel-roofed tobacco barns located near the northwest corner of the village that preserve the community's ties to the agricultural region it once served and the mid-19th century storehouses of "Boarman and Mudd" and "William N. Bean & Co."

It was added to the National Register of Historic Places in 1985.
