= Widow's Pleasure =

Historic house in Maryland, United States

- Formerly listed on the U.S. National Register of Historic Places
- Location within Maryland
- Nearest city: Piney Church Rd., near Waldorf, Maryland
- Coordinates: 38°34′50″N 76°47′38″W
- Area: 12 acres (4.9 ha)
- Built: ca. 1850s
- Architectural style: Early Republic
- NRHP reference No.: 89000664

Significant dates
- Added to NRHP: April 18, 1991
- Removed from NRHP: August 8, 2007

Widow's Pleasure was a historic home located near Waldorf, Charles County, Maryland, United States. The property included eight contributing buildings included a 7-room main house with portions dating from the 1850s and expanded several times since then; a ca. 1935 tobacco barn; a outhouse; a corn crib; a meat house; two poultry houses (ca. 1850 and ca. 1900); and a machine shed.

It was listed on the National Register of Historic Places in 1991. The property was delisted from the register in 2007, after the majority of buildings on the property were demolished.
