= Johnsontown (Waldorf, Maryland) =

Historic house in Maryland, United States

- Formerly listed on the U.S. National Register of Historic Places
- Nearest city: Fairgrounds Rd. E of Penn Central RR tracks, near La Plata, Maryland
- Area: 22.8 acres (9.2 ha)
- Built: ca. 1800
- Architectural style: Early Republic
- NRHP reference No.: 91000610

Significant dates
- Added to NRHP: May 31, 1991
- Removed from NRHP: May 11, 2006

Johnsontown was a historic home located near La Plata, Charles County, Maryland, United States. It was a two-story, two-part, clapboarded frame dwelling. The house was built between 1798 and 1818. The house was extensively renovated in 1980s. Also on the property was a heavily timber-framed granary, that dated to the early-19th century, and a family cemetery.

It was listed on the National Register of Historic Places in 1991. It was largely destroyed by fire in May 2005, and subsequently delisted from the register in 2006 after demolition.
