= Rosemary Lawn =

Historic house in Maryland, United States

- U.S. National Register of Historic Places
- Location within Maryland Location within the United States
- Nearest city: Fire Tower Rd., Welcome, Maryland
- Coordinates: 38°29′29″N 77°6′17″W
- Area: 73.5 acres (29.7 ha)
- Built: 1844
- Architectural style: Mid 19th Century Revival
- NRHP reference No.: 92000380
- Added to NRHP: April 16, 1992

Rosemary Lawn is a historic home and farm complex located at Welcome, Charles County, Maryland, United States. It is a rambling, two-story, frame farmhouse. The home is believed to be a largely rebuilt version of a house of similar size and configuration that was built between 1844 and 1847, when it was part of the estate of Barnes Compton inherited from his mother, Mary Key (Barnes) Compton (b. 1804 St. Mary's Co., MD -d. 17 JUL 1834, Charles Co., MD). As Barnes Compton was a minor until 1851, the plantation was managed by Wilson Compton, his paternal uncle and guardian, who added improvements such as the house.

Most of the exterior and interior finishes of the existing house were constructed during the 1880-1920 period, after the plantation had been sold by the Compton family. Outbuildings include a frame, pyramid-roofed dairy; a frame, pyramid-roofed "cooler" built over elevated foundations enclosing a cellar chamber; and a timber-framed, pyramid-roofed smokehouse.

The property is considered of historical significance because of the collection of buildings. It "embraces a singularly unique collection of historically and physically integrated agricultural buildings and domestic support structures, and constitutes the largest and best preserved collection of such buildings known to exist in their original setting in this region. In addition to the rarity of several of the buildings--notably the two dairies and the oldest granary--the manner in which each of the buildings was constructed to maximize its functional use, and their obviously carefully considered placement, is of exceptional interest and importance."

Also on the property is a private cemetery of the Barnes/Compton family, who owned and occupied the property from at least 1783 until 1873.

Rosemary Lawn was listed on the National Register of Historic Places in 1990.
