= Sarum (Newport, Maryland) =

Historic house in Maryland, United States

- U.S. National Register of Historic Places
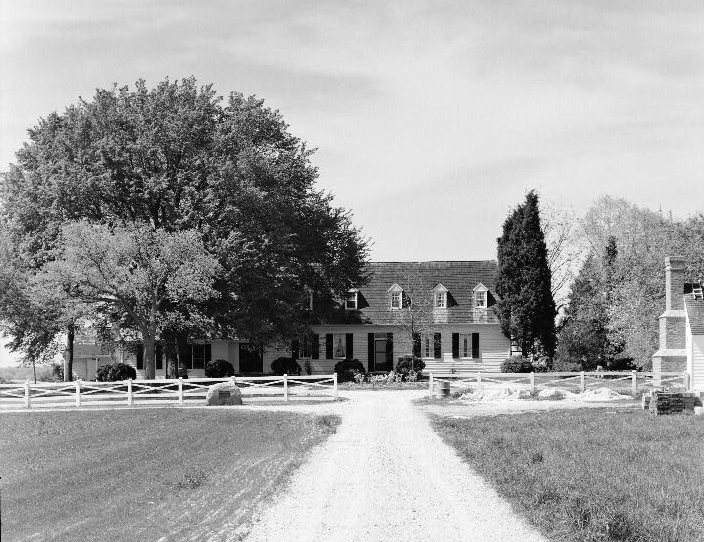

- Location within Maryland Location within the United States
- Location: Southeast of Newport off Maryland Route 234, Newport, Maryland
- Coordinates: 38°24′19″N 76°53′42″W
- Area: 245 acres (99 ha)
- Built: 1717
- Architectural style: Colonial
- NRHP reference No.: 74000948
- Added to NRHP: August 13, 1974

Sarum is a historic home located at Newport, Charles County, Maryland, US. The oldest extant part of the house was built in 1717 by Joseph Pile on or near the site of his grandfather's 17th century house. It was a box-framed hall and parlor dwelling, 32 by 18 feet. A shed was added in 1736; later in the 1800s the ends were extended and new walls of brick were constructed giving the house its present dimensions. Sarum was patented to John Pile in 1662, and remained in the ownership of the Pile family until 1836. It is one of Maryland's finest small Colonial dwellings.

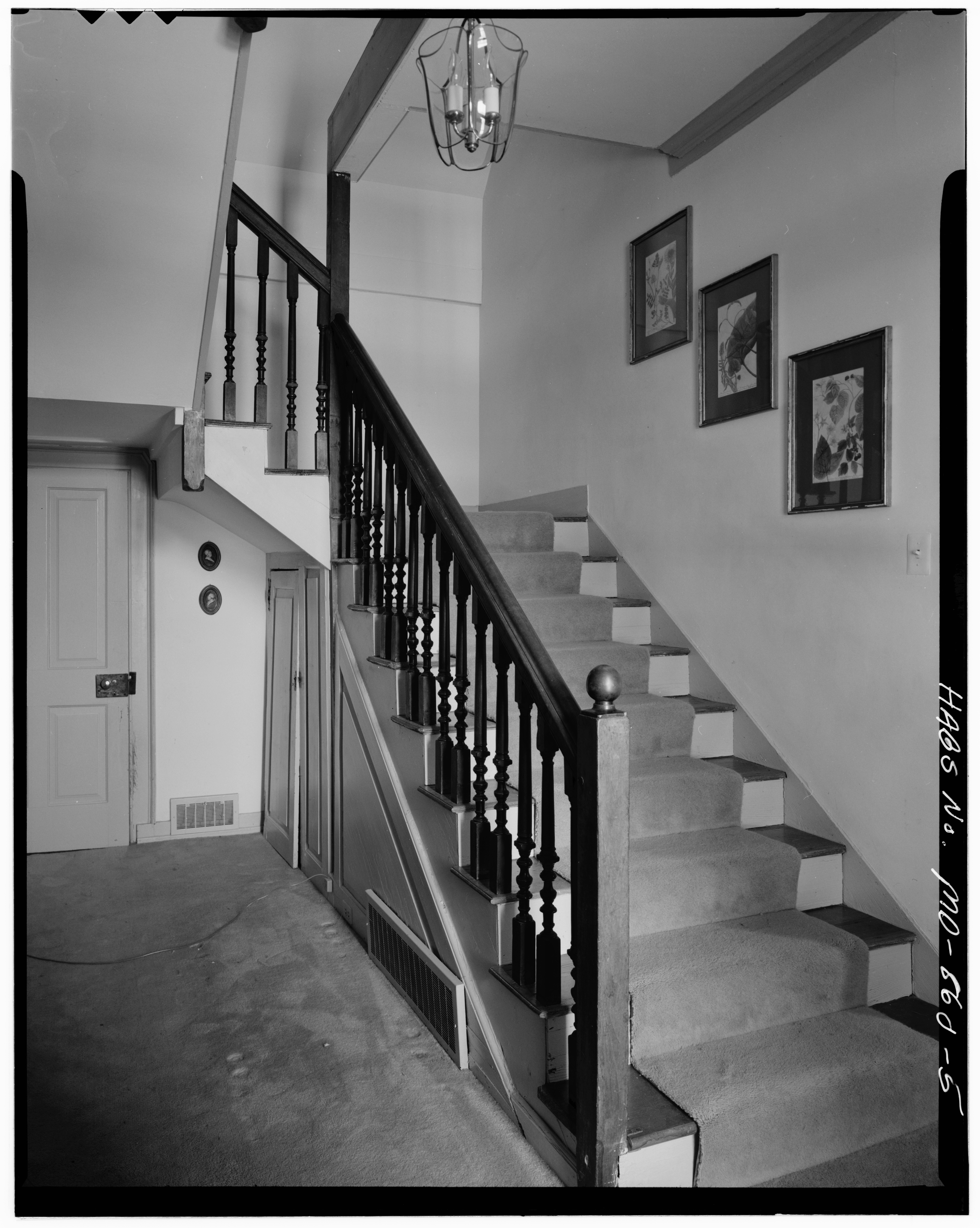
Interior stairwell, circa 1930s

It was listed on the National Register of Historic Places in 1974.
