= St. Mary's Roman Catholic Church (Newport, Maryland) =

Historic church in Maryland, United States

- St. Mary's Catholic Church, Newport
- U.S. National Register of Historic Places
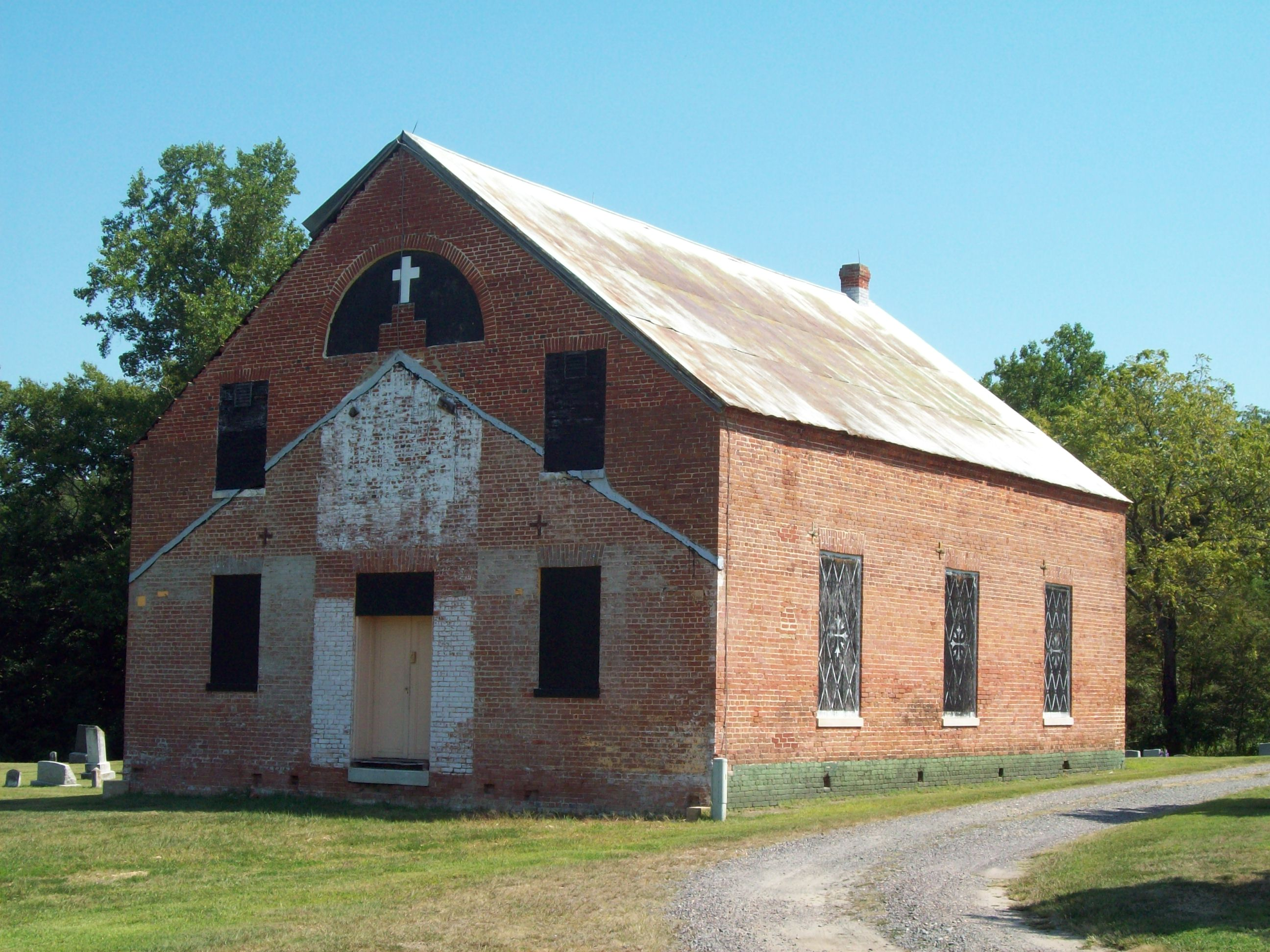
- St Mary's Catholic Church, Newport, MD, September 2009

- Location within Maryland Location within the United States
- Location: St. Mary's Church Rd., Newport, Maryland
- Coordinates: 38°25′53″N 76°54′23″W
- Area: 60 acres (24 ha)
- Built: 1840
- Architectural style: Greek Revival
- NRHP reference No.: 91000603
- Added to NRHP: May 30, 1991

St. Mary's Catholic Church, Newport is a historic parish located in Newport, Charles County, Maryland, established in 1674. Several churches have been built on the property over its history. At present there are two churches remaining, one built in 1840, deconsecrated in 1906 and no longer used for religious services, and the current church building, built in 1954. The historic 1840 church is a rectangular brick structure, four bays in length and three bays wide. It is of simple architectural styling typical of the Greek Revival period in this locality. Located on the property is the parish cemetery, which includes the burial plot of the Brent-Merrick family, including congressman William Duhurst Merrick (1793–1857). It has several impressively scaled and ornamented monuments enclosed within a decorative mid-19th century wrought iron fence. Other memorial stones bear the signature of "A. Geddess," who founded the long-active Geddess monument firm of Baltimore in 1822.

It was listed on the National Register of Historic Places in 1991.
