= Zekiah Swamp =

Swamp in Charles County, Maryland, United States of America

Zekiah Swamp Natural Environment Area
- Location within Maryland
- Location: Charles County, Maryland, United States
- Coordinates: 38°25′05″N 76°56′10″W
- Area: 450 acres (180 ha)
- Elevation: 3 ft (0.91 m)
- Named for: Zekiah Swamp
- Governing body: Maryland Department of Natural Resources
- Website: Charles County Greenways

Zekiah Swamp (/sɪˈkaɪə/ or /zɪˈkaɪə/) is a swamp in Charles County, Maryland, in the United States, formed by the Zekiah Swamp Run, a braided stream which becomes Allens Fresh Run as it debouches into the Wicomico River, a left tributary of the Tidal Potomac River. The Zekiah Swamp Run stretches 21 miles (34 km), the length of Charles County. The swamp's southern end is protected as the Zekiah Swamp Natural Environment Area, which has an area of 450 acres (180 ha) and an elevation of three feet (0.91 m) above sea level. The Maryland Department of Natural Resources has the authority to purchase an additional 5,000 acres (2,000 ha) for the Natural Environment Area. Charles County has moved to protect an additional 65,000 acres (26,000 ha) of the wetland. The headwaters of the swamp are protected as part of Cedarville State Forest. "Allen's Fresh" was first accurately surveyed in 1835, by John Henry Alexander, Maryland's official cartographer.

== Name ==
The name is recorded in English and French from the 17th century for the swamp, river, and local Algonquian band. Spelling Zekiah may have won over others attested, like Sacaya, by analogy with Biblical names like Hezekiah. The original phrase (in an Algonquian language, probably Nanticoke) is uncertain; two suggestions have meanings "where there is a bend" and "thick, dense".

== History ==
Maryland was formed as an English colony in 1634. One of the original Thirteen Colonies, the Province of Maryland was established by Cecilius Calvert, 2nd Baron Baltimore as a haven for Roman Catholic Englishmen. Much of Zekiah Swamp is now thickly wooded and very swampy, but during the colonial period it was a center of activity for the growing colony. A courthouse was built in 1674 and archaeologists believe they have found the location of a "summer house" constructed by colonial governor Charles Calvert, 3rd Baron Baltimore. Archaeologists have searched for a fort built in 1680 to resettle a group of "friendly" Piscataway Indians. The courthouse was built in 1674 at Moore's Lodge. It served as the Charles County courthouse until 1727 when the county government was moved to Port Tobacco. Early maps included a drawing of the courthouse. The drawing has allowed historians to know exactly what it looked like despite being unable to find its precise location for many years.

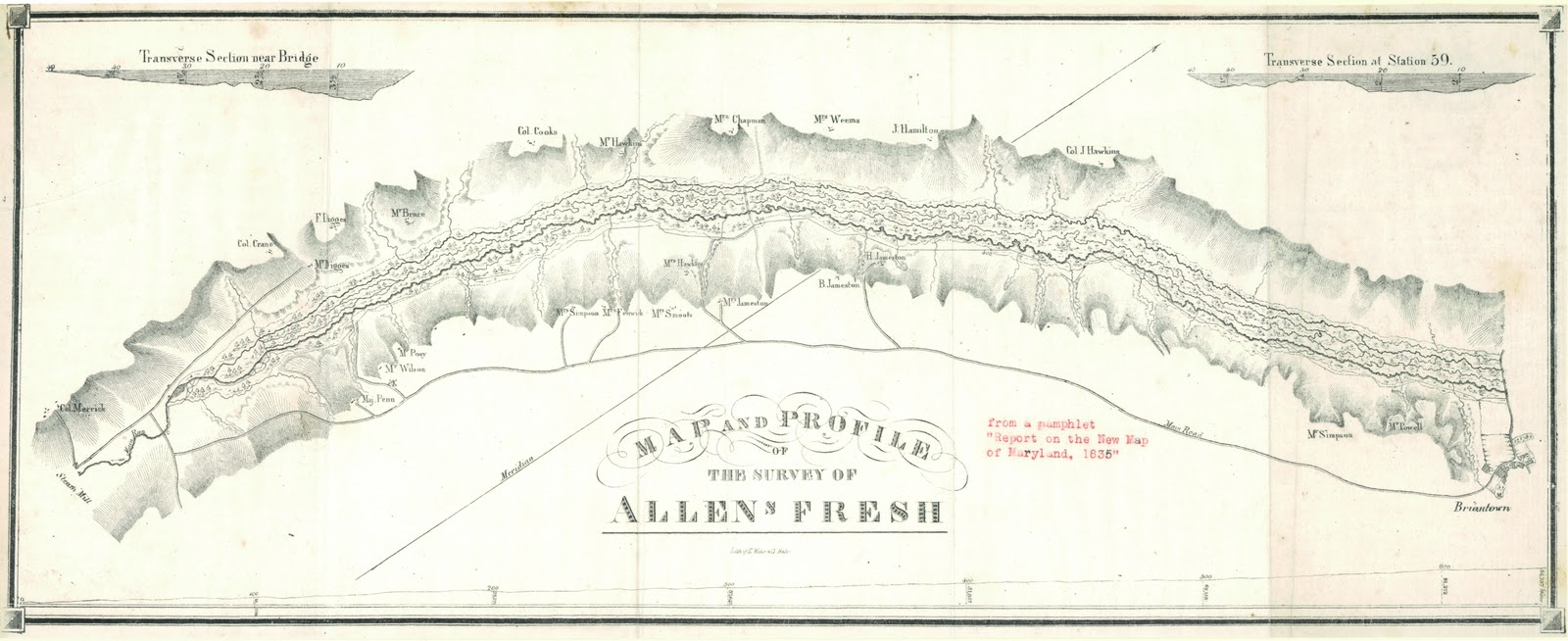
Zekiah Swamp

Charles Calvert, son of Maryland's founding governor Cecil Calvert, built a home in the area in 1674. The home known as His Lordship's Favor as a summer home and as a retreat from his "political enemies" at the colonial mansion at Mattapany which is now part of Patuxent Naval Air Station. Calvert intended to build a brick home rather than the usual wooden structure built by colonists in the area. He had to settle for a wooden home, but did build a brick chimney. Archaeologists found what they believe to be the site of the home, but have not found any artifacts that can be dated back to the 1670s. It is speculated that Calvert never actually occupied the home. Charles Calvert was forced to flee Maryland in 1684 in the aftermath of conflicts between colonists from Virginia and Maryland. In 2011, archaeologists identified the location of a 1680 fort that was built to protect the "friendly" Piscataways from the "hostile" Susquehannock. The Piscataway lived at the fort for about 12 years and enjoyed a working relationship with English colonists during that time.

After assassinating Abraham Lincoln in April 1865, John Wilkes Booth fled to southern Maryland, toward Zekiah Swamp. Booth entered the swamp after treatment by Dr. Samuel Mudd for the broken leg he suffered escaping Ford's Theater. A Black tobacco farmer guided Booth and his co-conspirator David Herold through the swamp to the home of a Confederate sympathizer, Samuel Cox. Cox led Booth and Herold to Thomas A. Jones who helped them the rest of the way through the Zekiah Swamp and across the Potomac River to Virginia.

== Ecology ==
Zekiah Swamp is a greenway. Greenways are often long, narrow strips of undeveloped land that are surrounded by urban, suburban or agricultural development. A tributary of the Potomac River, the swamp is 21 miles (34 km) of braided stream, stretching the length of Charles County. Zekiah Swamp Run begins in Cedarville State Forest near Charles County's border with Prince George's County. It passes through two parcels of privately owned, but undeveloped land, to Zekiah Swamp Natural Environment Area where it empties into the Wicomico.

Maryland is home to a wide array of ecological habitats, ranging from barrier islands and beaches, to saltwater estuaries, coastal plains and the Appalachian Mountains. It is estimated that prior to European settlement that the state was 95% forested with the remaining 5% being tidal marshlands. Most of the forests and marshes have since been destroyed by development. Zekiah Swamp Natural Environment Area is one of the few places in Charles County to be undisturbed. Moves to protect all of the swamp have been taken by the Maryland state government and the Charles County government.

Zekiah Swamp is the largest hardwood swamp in Maryland. It is considered to be one of the "most important ecological areas on the East Coast" by the Smithsonian Institution. Sediment buildup in the Potomac and Chesapeake Bay will be slowed or prevented by the protection of plant life in the swamps. The plants work to absorb much of the runoff that would otherwise pollute the waters.

== Recreational use ==
Although the Zekiah Swamp Natural Environment Area is primarily owned by the Maryland Department of Natural Resources, it isn't managed for recreation. As a result, there are no paved public access roads, parking areas, or scenic overlooks. Nor are there marked or developed trails, picnic areas, campsites, or visitor centers. Nonetheless, a limited level of recreational use is still possible. In connection with its Potomac Heritage National Scenic Trail system, the U.S. National Park Service notes that access is possible by way of the intersection of U.S. Highway 301 and SR 234 (Budds Creek Road). Traveling east from that point on SR 234, one comes to Penn's Hill Road/Allen’s Fresh Road. Following Allen's Fresh Road south at mile 23.2, there is a dirt road on the west side that leads through the swamp and woods to Allen's Fresh Run of the Wicomico River. This is suitable for driving or walking. Other sight-seeing or photo opportunities are possible with brief stops along the shoulder of SR 234 where it passes through the Natural Environment Area. Similar possibilities exist to the north on SR 6 (Charles Street) that runs between La Plata and Charlotte Hall.
