= The Lindens (Bryantown, Maryland) =

Historic house in Maryland, United States

- U.S. National Register of Historic Places
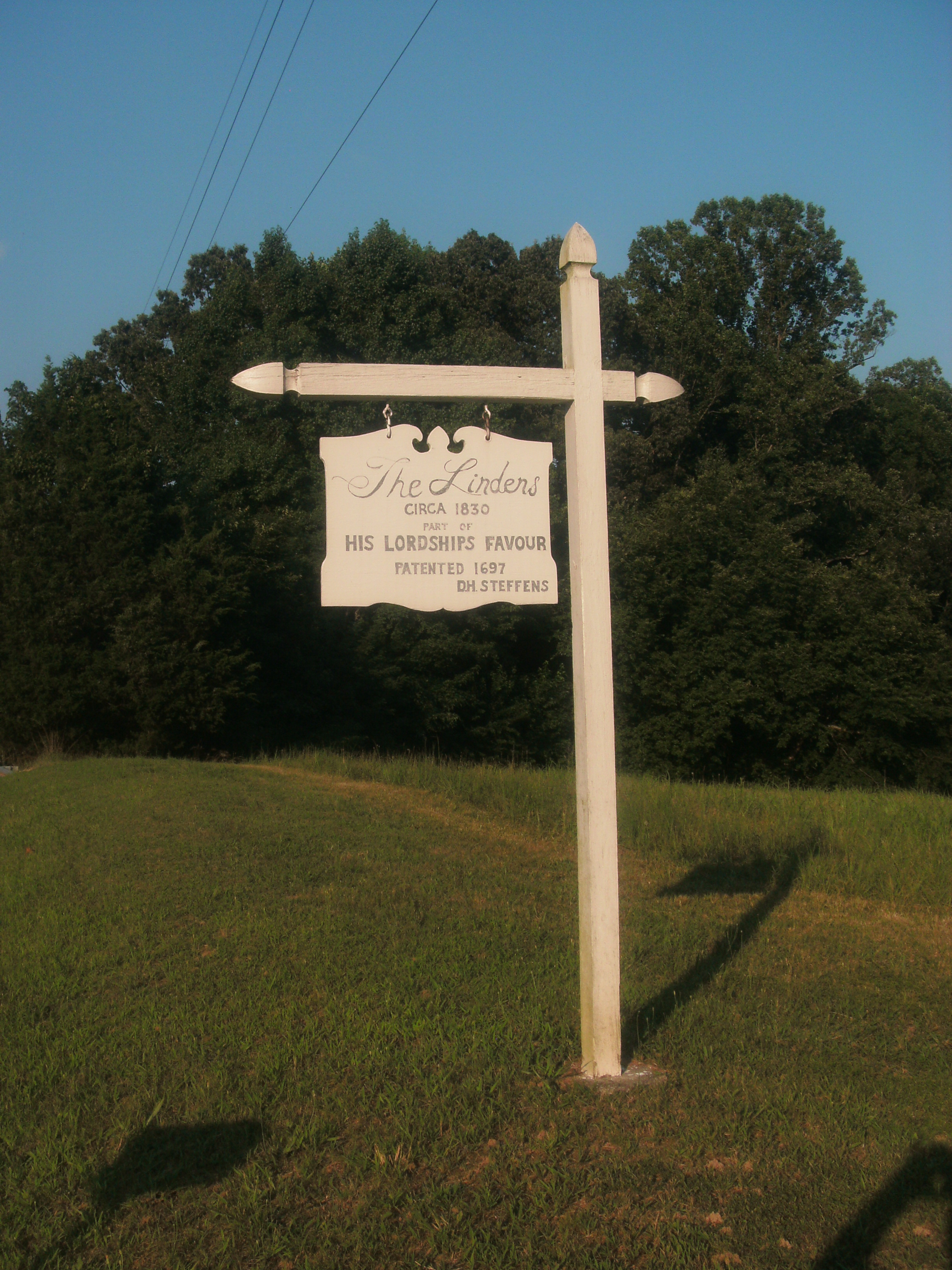
- Sign at The Lindens

- Location within Maryland Location within the United States
- Location: Maryland Route 488, Bryantown, Maryland
- Coordinates: 38°33′7″N 76°52′32″W
- Area: 158 acres (64 ha)
- Built: 1840
- Architectural style: Greek Revival, Federal
- NRHP reference No.: 90000607
- Added to NRHP: April 23, 1990

The Lindens is a historic home located near Bryantown, Charles County, Maryland. It is a two-story frame house built during the second quarter of the 19th century in the Federal style. It is in the double parlor plan with Greek Revival mantels and an exterior double chimney. It overlooks the lower fields of the farm and the Zekiah Swamp.

It was listed on the National Register of Historic Places in 1990. The letters "JFG" are found carved into the chimney with the date 1840. The house sits on His Lordships Place and is privately owned.
