= McPherson's Purchase =

Historic house in Maryland, United States

- U.S. National Register of Historic Places
- Location within Maryland Location within the United States
- Location: Maryland Route 227, Pomfret, Maryland
- Coordinates: 38°35′56″N 77°2′51″W
- Area: 120 acres (49 ha)
- Built: 1920
- NRHP reference No.: 85000019
- Added to NRHP: January 3, 1985

McPherson's Purchase is a historic farm complex dating to the 19th century and located near Pomfret, Charles County, Maryland, United States.

It is a working farm encompassing 120 acres (0.49 km^{2}), a majority of which is cleared and under cultivation. Located there is a complex of 18 domestic and agricultural support structures, 11 of which date prior to 1870. They include two tobacco barns, two wagon or equipment sheds, a corncrib, and a granary, all dating from about 1840–1860, and a former tobacco house built in the late 18th century. Other buildings include a kitchen-service structure, a small garden or storage shed, and a meathouse. A duplex slave quarters with a central chimney is also on the property as well as seven early 20th-century buildings, including a double-pile frame house of simple architectural styling built about 1910. It is significant as a unique representative of a regionally typical 19th-century farmstead.

McPherson's Purchase was listed on the National Register of Historic Places in 1985.
