= Thainston =

Historic district in Maryland, United States

- U.S. National Register of Historic Places
- U.S. Historic district
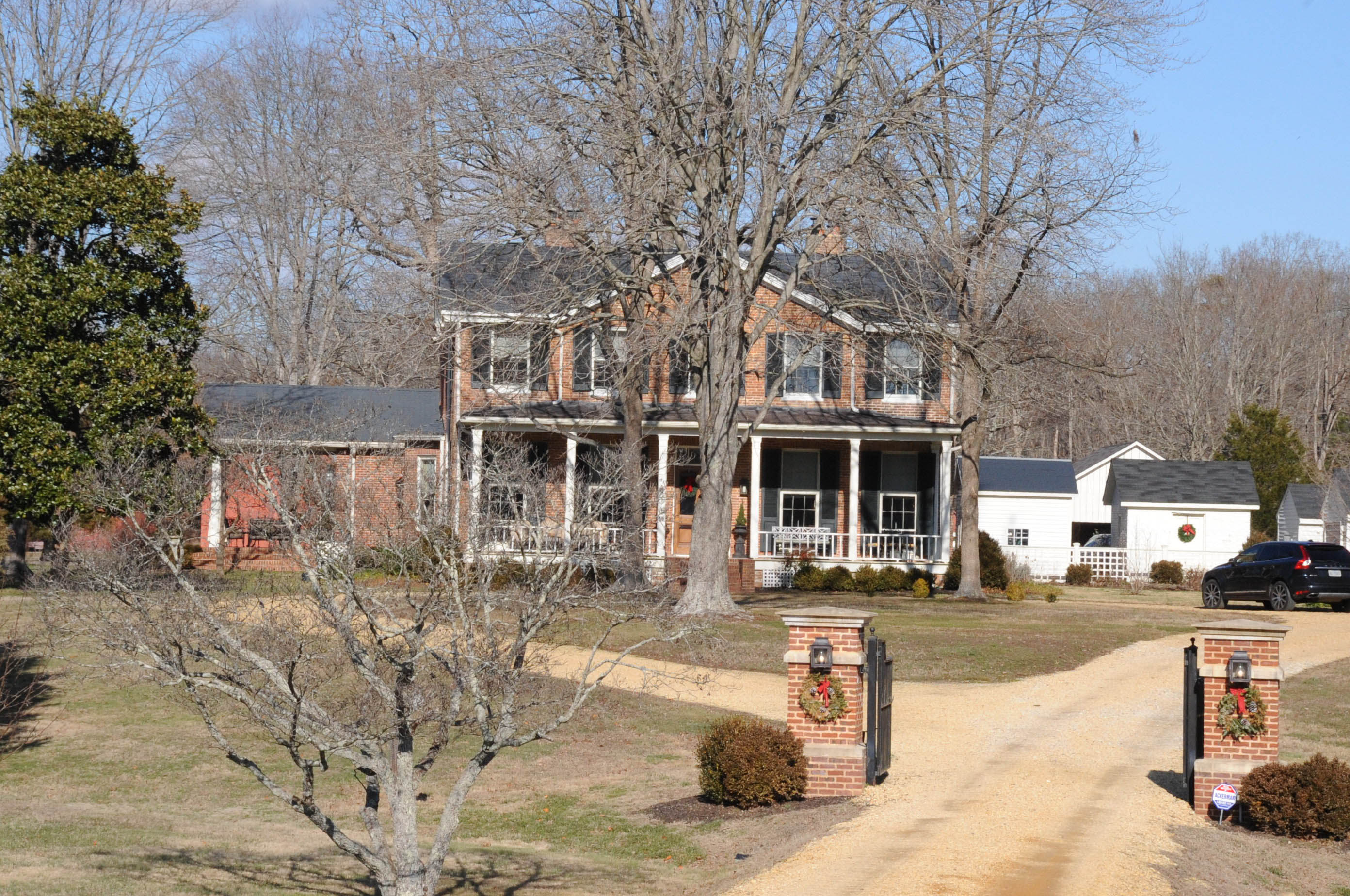
- In 2020

- Location within Maryland Location within the United States
- Location: Mitchell Rd., north of Maryland Route 225, La Plata, Maryland
- Coordinates: 38°34′6″N 77°0′35″W
- Area: 378.6 acres (153.2 ha)
- Built: 1865
- Built by: Faxon, Eben; Ogle, Charles
- Architectural style: Mid 19th Century Revival
- NRHP reference No.: 90000436
- Added to NRHP: March 28, 1990

Thainston is a farm complex and national historic district in La Plata, Charles County, Maryland, United States. The main house is a two-story, L-shaped brick house built in 1865 and enlarged early in the 20th century. It was designed by Eben Faxon, a Baltimore architect, and constructed under the supervision of Charles Ogle, a building contractor also from Baltimore. The farm developed between 1865 and the 1930s. Included on the property are a number of early dependencies, including a wellhouse, a brick dairy, a storage building, and a meathouse. A frame garage and large chicken house, both dating from the early 1900s, are on the property. There is also a collection of agricultural buildings including: tobacco barns, cattle barns, and equipment sheds clustered around a corncrib/granary. There are three frame tenant houses, several associated sheds, a probably early building site, an early well, a pit remaining from a former ice house, and the former ice ponds. Another early-20th century building, a tobacco barn, stands in a field to the west of the main grouping of agricultural buildings.

Thainston was added to the National Register of Historic Places in 1990.
