= Newport, Charles County, Maryland =

Unincorporated community in Maryland, United States

Newport, Maryland
- Unincorporated community
- Location within the state of Maryland Newport (the United States)
- Coordinates: 38°25′10″N 76°54′12″W
- Country: United States
- State: Maryland
- County: Charles
- Time zone: UTC-5 (Eastern (EST))
  - Summer (DST): UTC-4 (EDT)
- GNIS feature ID: 588703

Newport is an unincorporated community in Charles County, Maryland, United States. Sarum was listed on the National Register of Historic Places in 1974. St. Mary's Roman Catholic Church is a historic Roman Catholic church listed on the National Register of Historic Places in 1991.
