= The Exchange (La Plata, Maryland) =

Historic house in Maryland, United States

- U.S. National Register of Historic Places
- Location within Maryland Location within the United States
- Location: 7310 Greenland Place, La Plata, Maryland
- Coordinates: 38°30′54″N 76°58′23″W
- Area: 7.6 acres (3.1 ha)
- Built: 1778
- NRHP reference No.: 84001763
- Added to NRHP: June 7, 1984

The Exchange is a historic home located at La Plata, Charles County, Maryland, United States. It is a narrow, one-story, two-bay, gambrel-roofed frame house built about 1778, for a family of moderate economic means. Among its most notable features is its interior woodwork. Also on the property is a small, late-18th century frame tobacco house, a 20th-century frame garage, well house, and a swimming pool.

The Exchange was listed on the National Register of Historic Places in 1984.
