= Truman's Place =

Historic house in Maryland, United States

- U.S. National Register of Historic Places
- Location within Maryland Location within the United States
- Location: Gallant Green Rd., Hughesville, Maryland
- Coordinates: 38°33′58″N 76°46′41″W
- Area: 18 acres (7.3 ha)
- Built: 1770
- Architect: Gardiner, Richard; Gardiner, Thomas I.
- Architectural style: Mid 19th Century Revival
- NRHP reference No.: 87002264
- Added to NRHP: January 20, 1988

Truman's Place is a historic home located at Hughesville, Charles County, Maryland, United States. It is a 2 1/2-story brick structure with a smaller two-story brick wing built in the mid-19th century. The house incorporates the brick shell of a 1770, one-story, five-bay dwelling with a kitchen-service wing. Outbuildings include a tenant house with an attached stable, a tobacco barn, a garden shed, and a three-bay garage. The home takes its name from a 1,000-acre (4.0 km^{2}) proprietary manor grant to Nathaniel Truman in 1666.

Truman's Place was listed on the National Register of Historic Places in 1988.
