= Mount Air =

Historic house in Maryland, United States

- U.S. National Register of Historic Places
- Location within Maryland Location within the United States
- Location: West of Faulkner off U.S. Route 301, Faulkner, Maryland
- Coordinates: 38°26′12″N 76°59′50″W
- Area: 405.4 acres (164.1 ha)
- Built: 1801
- Architectural style: Federal
- NRHP reference No.: 78001453
- Added to NRHP: December 22, 1978

Mount Air is a historic home located at Faulkner, Charles County, Maryland, United States. It was built in 1801, and is basically a regionally typical Federal style house with a three-story central block with complementary wings. The home has the only known boxwood garden in lower Southern Maryland of its dimensions and age to retain its original formal plan.

Mount Air was listed on the National Register of Historic Places in 1978.
