= Welcome, Maryland =

Unincorporated community in Maryland, United States

- Unincorporated community
- Location within the state of Maryland Welcome (the United States)
- Coordinates: 38°28′50″N 77°5′45″W
- Country: United States
- State: Maryland
- County: Charles
- Time zone: UTC-5 (Eastern (EST))
  - Summer (DST): UTC-4 (EDT)
- ZIP codes: 20693

Welcome is an unincorporated community in Charles County, Maryland, United States. The designated zip code is 20693.

It is located seven miles from La Plata on Maryland Route 6 West. The Goose Bay campground and marina are also located in Welcome. Rosemary Lawn, a plantation owned since the 18th century by the Barnes-Compton family, was listed on the National Register of Historic Places in 1992.

The McConchie One-Room School was a segregated school for Black children that operated from 1912 to 1956 in Welcome. The school is now an exhibit at the Charles County Fairgrounds in La Plata.

== Notable person ==
- Barnes Compton, 19th-century Congressman and state senator, who resided at Rosemary Lawn, a plantation inherited from his mother, Mary Key (Barnes) Compton.
