= Timber Neck Farm =

Historic district in Maryland, United States

- U.S. National Register of Historic Places
- U.S. Historic district
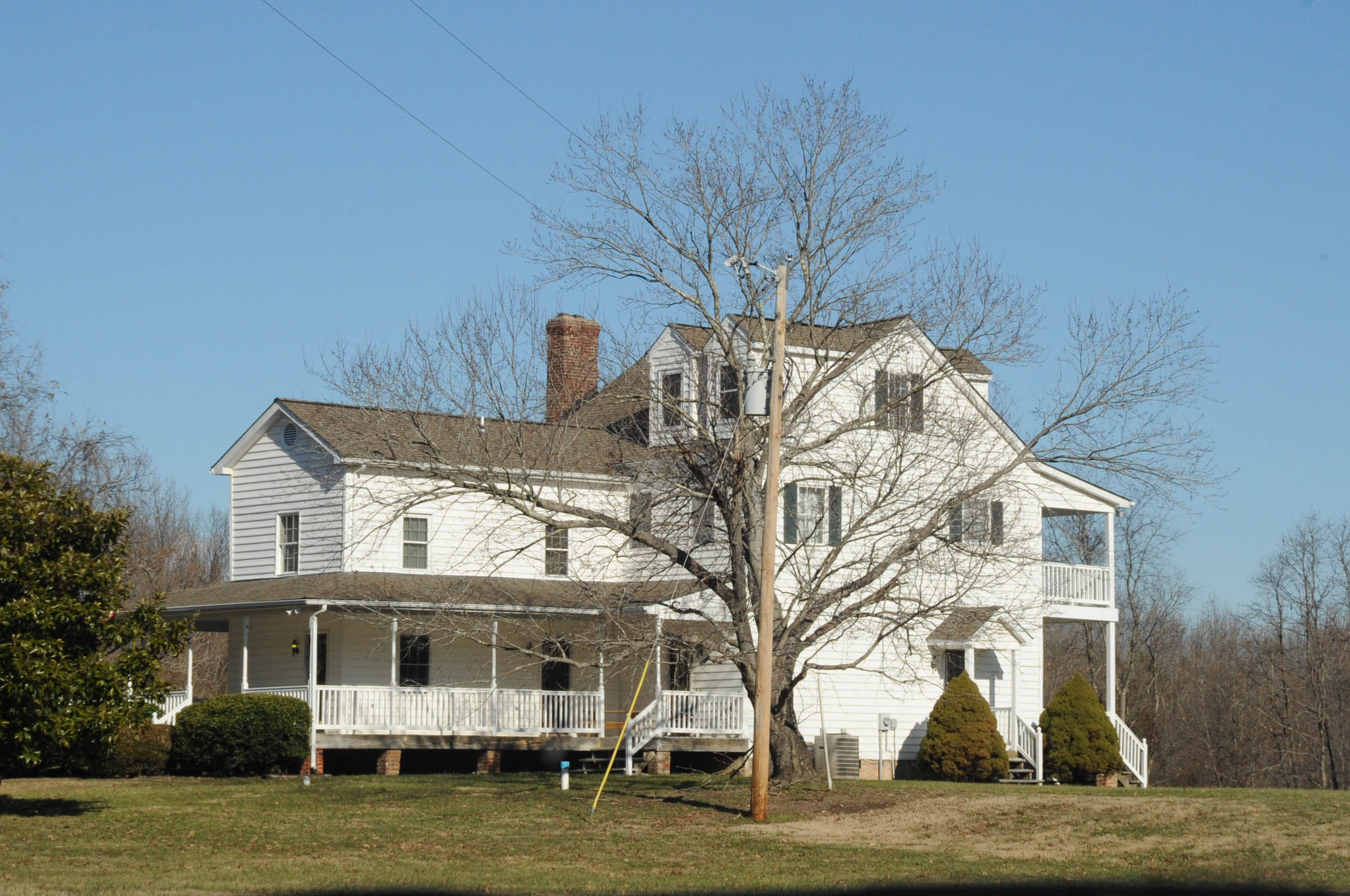

- Location within Maryland Location within the United States
- Location: Southeast of Faulkner Rd., Faulkner, Maryland
- Coordinates: 38°25′52″N 76°57′8″W
- Area: 247 acres (100 ha)
- Built: 1780
- Built by: Posey, Belain
- Architectural style: Federal
- NRHP reference No.: 79001123
- Added to NRHP: September 6, 1979

Timber Neck Farm (formerly known as Laurel Grove) is a farm complex and national historic district in Faulkner, Charles County, Maryland, United States. The main house is a 2 1/2-story, L-shaped frame structure with a large double chimney.

The Timber Neck Farm was added to the National Register of Historic Places in 1979.
