= Johnsontown Tobacco Barn No. 2 =

- U.S. National Register of Historic Places
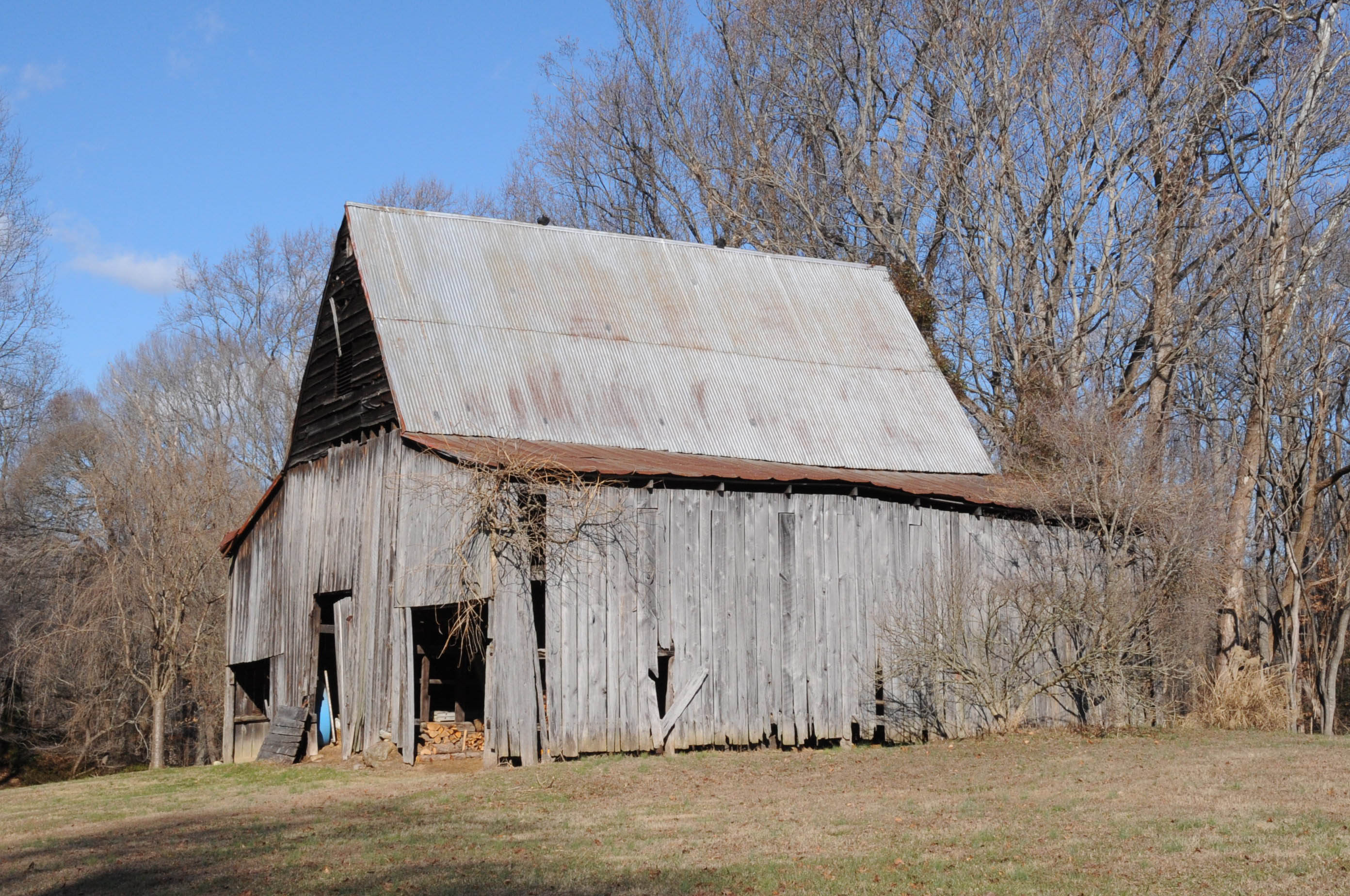
- In 2020

- Location within Maryland Location within the United States
- Nearest city: 9830 Johnsontown Rd., La Plata, Maryland
- Coordinates: 38°29′12″N 76°58′17″W
- Built: c. 1820
- NRHP reference No.: 11000947
- Added to NRHP: December 27, 2011

The Johnsontown Tobacco Barn No. 2 is a historic tobacco barn in Charles County, Maryland, near La Plata. Built around 1820, the barn offers evidence of early use of fire in the tobacco curing process. Its framing consists of hand-hewn timber secure with wooden pegs and pit-sawn secondary framing members. The exterior is sheathed in vertical board siding, though evidence suggests it was originally covered with horizontal siding.

The barn was listed on the National Register of Historic Places in 2011.
