= Bel Alton, Maryland =

Unincorporated community in Maryland, United States

- Unincorporated community
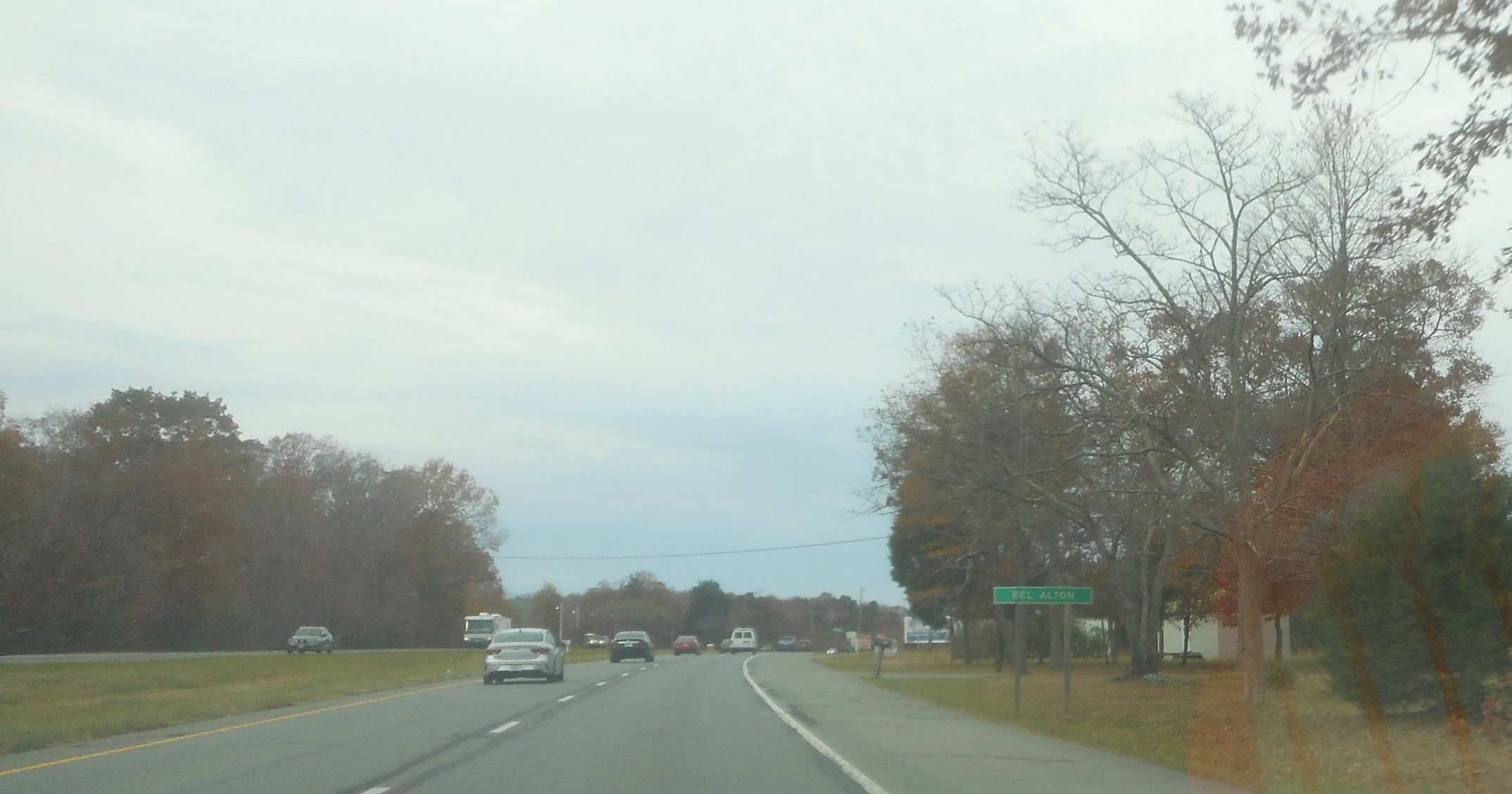
- Northbound US 301 as it enters Bel Alton, Maryland; November 2021.

- Location within the state of Maryland Bel Alton (the United States)
- Coordinates: 38°27′50″N 76°58′58″W
- Country: United States
- State: Maryland
- County: Charles
- Time zone: UTC−5 (Eastern (EST))
  - Summer (DST): UTC−4 (EDT)
- ZIP code: 20611
- Area codes: 240 and 301
- GNIS feature ID: 588747

Bel Alton is an unincorporated community in Charles County, Maryland, United States. It is marked by old-style motels, a popular "bikers'" tavern, and other small businesses along U.S. Route 301 catering to local residents and interstate travelers. A series of interpretive signs on a side road mark various spots where, in April 1865, John Wilkes Booth stopped to hide during his flight south after assassinating President Abraham Lincoln. St. Ignatius Church and Cemetery, the oldest continuous Roman Catholic parish in the United States (although this claim is contested by another church in New Mexico), is two miles west of Bel Alton on a scenic bluff overlooking a wide inlet of the Potomac River. The county fairgrounds are also nearby. The former Bel Alton African American high school building is now used for community activities. Before 1891, Bel Alton was known as Cox's Station after a local resident. The area is poised for growth as construction has started on a housing development, "Stagecoach Crossing", two miles north.

Rich Hill was listed on the National Register of Historic Places in 1975.
