= Faulkner, Maryland =

Unincorporated community in Maryland, United States

- Unincorporated community
- Location within the state of Maryland Faulkner (the United States)
- Coordinates: 38°26′20″N 76°58′42″W
- Country: United States
- State: Maryland
- County: Charles
- Time zone: UTC-5 (Eastern (EST))
  - Summer (DST): UTC-4 (EDT)
- ZIP code: 20632
- Area codes: 240 and 301
- GNIS feature ID: 584352

Faulkner is an unincorporated community in Charles County, Maryland, United States. It is home to the Loyola Roman Catholic retreat center. Near here, John Wilkes Booth, assisted by Thomas A. Jones of Huckleberry Farm, was rowed across the Potomac River into Virginia, a week after he assassinated President Abraham Lincoln. The community was called Lothair before being renamed for a local resident.

Landmarks include Mount Air, a Federal style house which was listed on the National Register of Historic Places in 1978 and Timber Neck Farm added in 1979.
