= Rich Hill (Bel Alton, Maryland) =

Historic house in Maryland, United States

- U.S. National Register of Historic Places
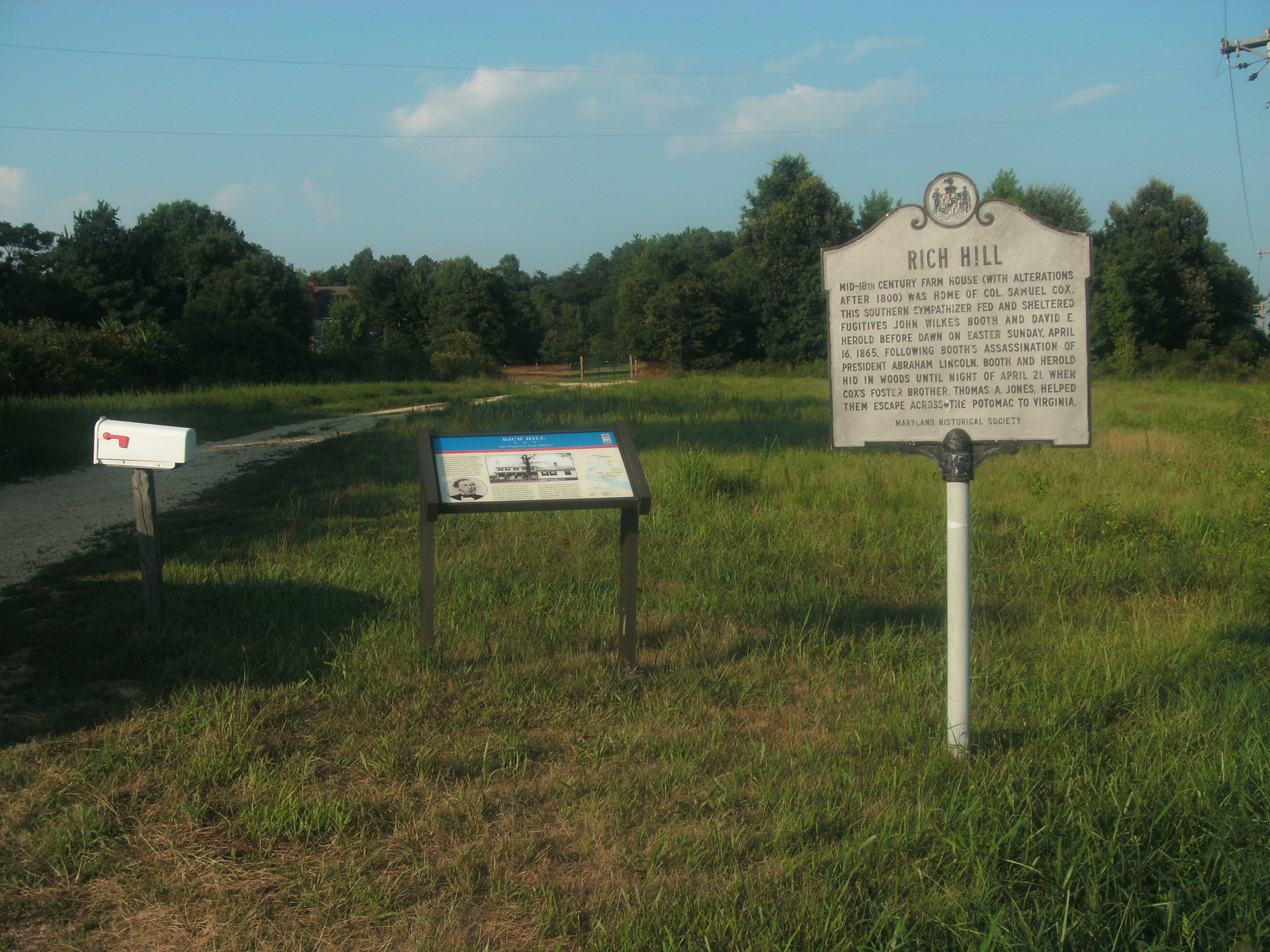

- Location within Maryland Location within the United States
- Location: Northeast of Bel Alton on Bel Alton-Newtown Rd., Bel Alton, Maryland
- Coordinates: 38°28′54″N 76°57′3″W
- Area: 15 acres (6.1 ha)
- Built: 1825
- NRHP reference No.: 75000885
- Added to NRHP: November 12, 1975

Rich Hill, near Bel Alton, Maryland, was owned by Colonel Samuel Cox, a Confederate sympathizer during the American Civil War. Following the assassination of President Abraham Lincoln on April 14, 1865, Cox hid assassin John Wilkes Booth and his companion, David Herold, in a swamp near Rich Hill. Booth and Herold left the property on April 21, crossing the Potomac River in a small boat.

Following Booth's capture, Cox was tried and convicted of aiding Booth, receiving a light sentence.

The house is significant in its own right, showing characteristic features of southern Maryland house construction.

It was listed on the National Register of Historic Places in 1975.
