= Bryantown, Maryland =

- Census-designated place
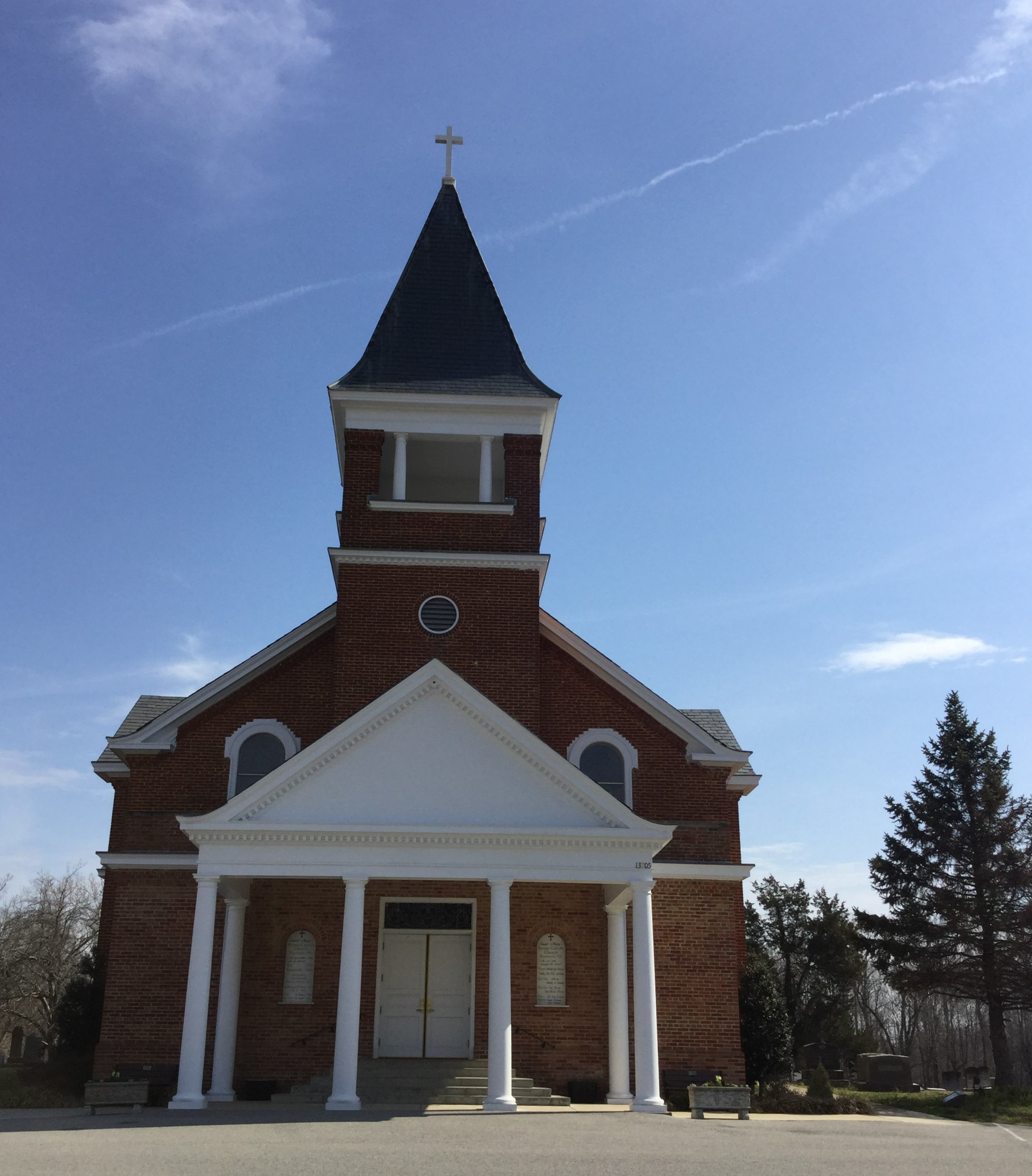
- St Mary's Catholic Church

- Location within the state of Maryland Bryantown (the United States)
- Coordinates: 38°33′18″N 76°50′31″W
- Country: United States
- State: Maryland
- County: Charles

Area
  - Total: 4.15 sq mi (10.74 km^{2})
  - Land: 4.14 sq mi (10.73 km^{2})
  - Water: 0 sq mi (0.00 km^{2})

Population (2020)
  - Total: 653
  - Density: 157.6/sq mi (60.84/km^{2})
- Time zone: UTC−5 (Eastern (EST))
  - Summer (DST): UTC−4 (EDT)
- ZIP code: 20617
- Area code: 301
- FIPS code: 24-10950
- GNIS feature ID: 589841

Bryantown is an unincorporated community and census-designated place in Charles County, Maryland, United States, adjacent to Maryland Route 5. As of the 2010 census, it had a population of 655.

Bryantown stands on land known as Boarman's Manor, a 4,000-acre (16 km^{2}) manor granted to Major William Boarman in 1674. Bryantown is associated with the flight in 1865 of President Abraham Lincoln's assassin John Wilkes Booth, and its St. Mary's Catholic Church is the burial place of Dr. Samuel Mudd, who lived 5 miles (8.0 km) to the north, and who in November 1864 had first met Booth at the church.

Oakland was listed on the National Register of Historic Places in 1983. The Bryantown Historic District was listed in 1985, and The Lindens in 1990.

== Demographics ==
Historical population
Census	Pop.	Note	%±
2020	653		—
U.S. Decennial Census; 2010 2020

Bryantown first appeared as a census designated place in the 2010 U.S. census.
