= Hughesville, Maryland =

- Census-designated place
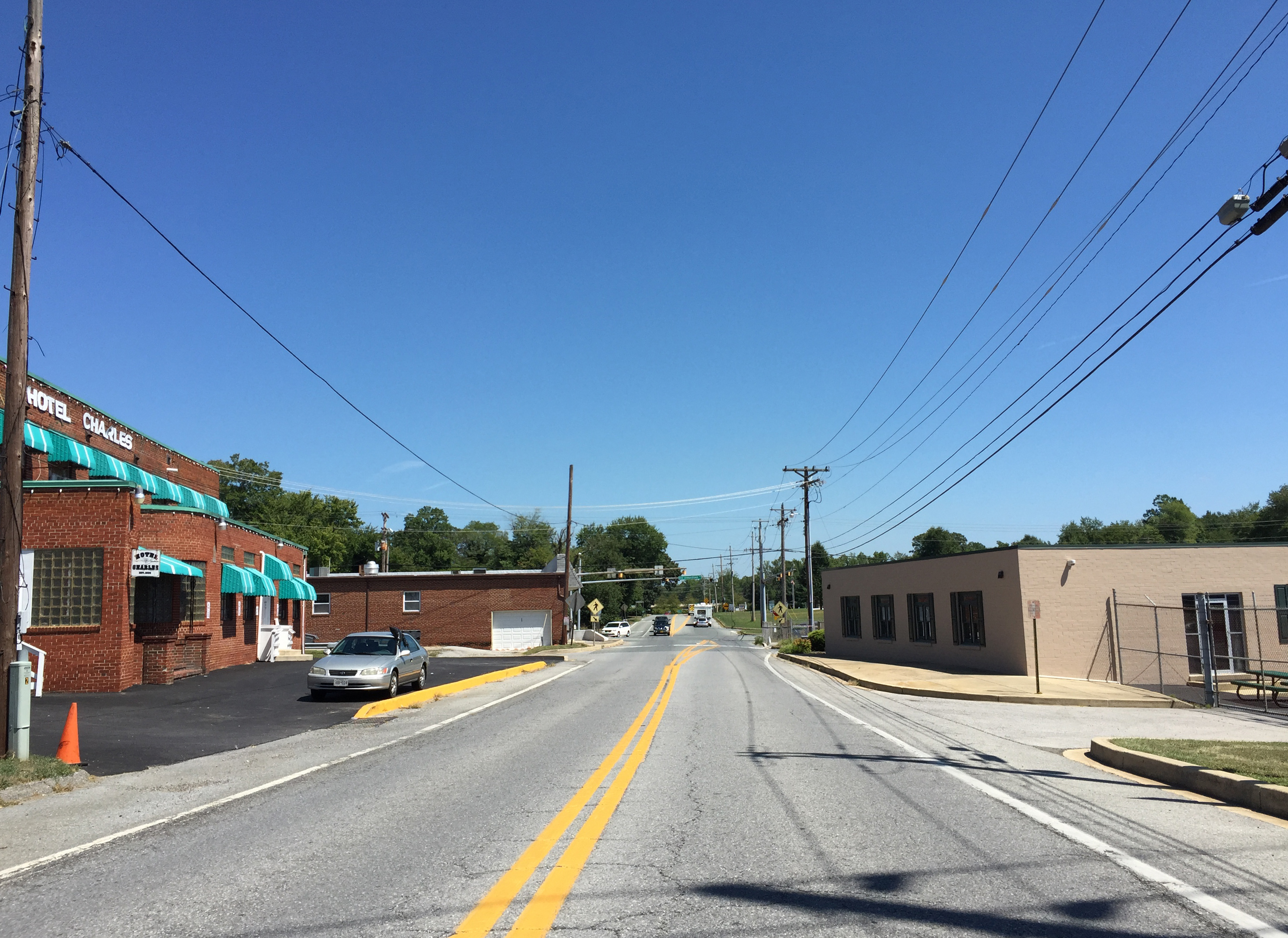
- Buildings along Burnt Store Road

- Location of Hughesville, Maryland
- Coordinates: 38°32′1″N 76°46′56″W
- Country: United States
- State: Maryland
- County: Charles

Area
  - Total: 11.23 sq mi (29.08 km^{2})
  - Land: 11.15 sq mi (28.88 km^{2})
  - Water: 0.077 sq mi (0.20 km^{2})
- Elevation: 180 ft (55 m)

Population (2020)
  - Total: 2,438
  - Density: 218.6/sq mi (84.42/km^{2})
- Time zone: UTC−5 (Eastern (EST))
  - Summer (DST): UTC−4 (EDT)
- ZIP code: 20637
- Area codes: 301, 240
- FIPS code: 24-40700
- GNIS feature ID: 0590512

Hughesville is a census-designated place (CDP) in Charles County, Maryland, United States. The population was 2,197 at the 2010 census. Truman's Place was listed on the National Register of Historic Places in 1988.

== Geography ==
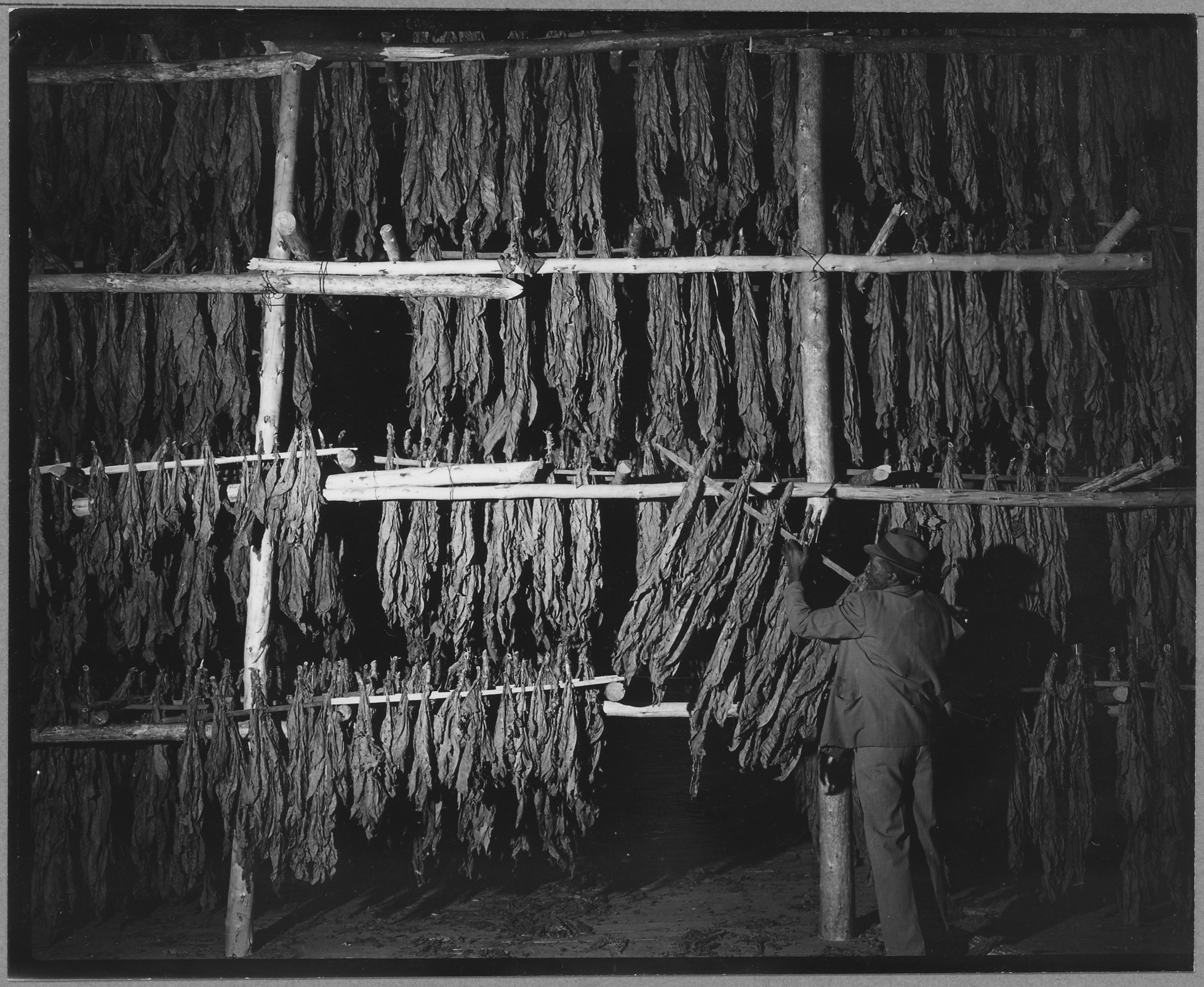
Tobacco being dried in one of the Hughesville warehouses, 1941

According to the United States Census Bureau, the CDP has a total area of 11.2 square miles (29.1 km^{2}), of which 11.2 square miles (28.9 km^{2}) is land and 0.08 square miles (0.2 km^{2}), or 0.69%, is water.

Hughesville was a tobacco market town. The former tobacco warehouses are now used for second-hand thrift stores and boutique gift and craft shops.

Because Hughesville, though small, is considered the strategic geographic center of the tri-county Southern Maryland region, it houses institutions such as the headquarters for the Southern Maryland Electric Cooperative, an animal shelter, an economic development council, a board of realtors, and a homeless women's shelter, which serve the tri-county area. There is also a Girl Scout camp. The town has no traditional grid-layout streets, but consists of merely businesses along the highway and some very small outlying housing developments. It was announced in 2013 that the College of Southern Maryland is building their fourth campus in the town.

A 5.5-MW solar farm near Hughesville generates enough power for 600 homes, and offsets the pollution of 1,600 cars.

== Demographics ==
Historical population
Census	Pop.	Note	%±
2020	2,438		—
U.S. Decennial Census

=== 2020 census ===
As of the 2020 census, Hughesville had a population of 2,438. The median age was 45.8 years. 20.6% of residents were under the age of 18 and 14.4% of residents were 65 years of age or older. For every 100 females there were 101.2 males, and for every 100 females age 18 and over there were 97.9 males age 18 and over.

0.0% of residents lived in urban areas, while 100.0% lived in rural areas.

There were 842 households in Hughesville, of which 35.2% had children under the age of 18 living in them. Of all households, 66.7% were married-couple households, 12.4% were households with a male householder and no spouse or partner present, and 15.7% were households with a female householder and no spouse or partner present. About 15.9% of all households were made up of individuals and 7.5% had someone living alone who was 65 years of age or older.

There were 875 housing units, of which 3.8% were vacant. The homeowner vacancy rate was 1.0% and the rental vacancy rate was 1.3%.

Racial composition as of the 2020 census
Race	Number	Percent
White	1,365	56.0%
Black or African American	756	31.0%
American Indian and Alaska Native	19	0.8%
Asian	56	2.3%
Native Hawaiian and Other Pacific Islander	4	0.2%
Some other race	27	1.1%
Two or more races	211	8.7%
Hispanic or Latino (of any race)	100	4.1%

=== 2000 census ===
As of the 2000 census, there were 1,537 people, 503 households, and 407 families residing in the CDP. The population density was 137.4 inhabitants per square mile (53.1/km^{2}). There were 529 housing units at an average density of 47.3 per square mile (18.3/km^{2}). The racial makeup of the CDP was 82.04% White, 13.08% African American, 0.72% Native American, 2.73% Asian, 0.07% Pacific Islander, 0.13% from other races, and 1.24% from two or more races. Hispanic or Latino of any race were 0.65% of the population.

There were 503 households, out of which 36.4% had children under the age of 18 living with them, 68.2% were married couples living together, 7.4% had a female householder with no husband present, and 18.9% were non-families. 12.7% of all households were made up of individuals, and 4.6% had someone living alone who was 65 years of age or older. The average household size was 2.97 and the average family size was 3.25.

In the CDP, the population was spread out, with 26.3% under the age of 18, 6.5% from 18 to 24, 30.0% from 25 to 44, 27.3% from 45 to 64, and 10.0% who were 65 years of age or older. The median age was 38 years. For every 100 females, there were 99.4 males. For every 100 females age 18 and over, there were 97.4 males.

The median income for a household in the CDP was $90,697, and the median income for a family was $103,393. Males had a median income of $49,500 versus $36,563 for females. The per capita income for the CDP was $29,884. About 4.8% of families and 7.1% of the population were below the poverty line, including 7.9% of those under age 18 and 5.1% of those age 65 or over.
