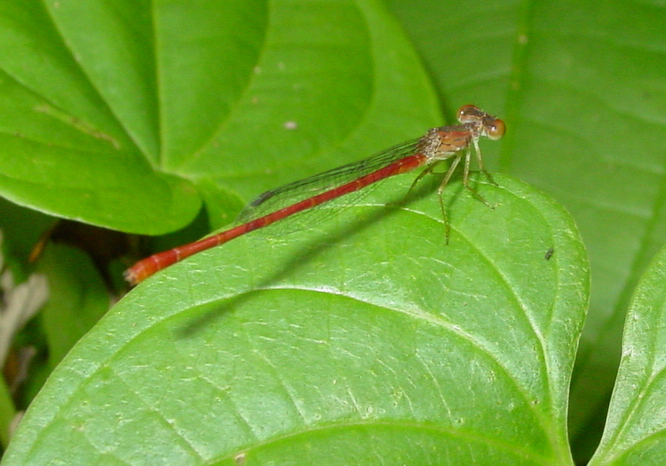

Conservation status
- Least Concern (IUCN 3.1)

Scientific classification
- Kingdom: Animalia
- Phylum: Arthropoda
- Clade: Pancrustacea
- Class: Insecta
- Order: Odonata
- Suborder: Zygoptera
- Family: Coenagrionidae
- Genus: Telebasis
- Species: T. byersi

Binomial name
- Telebasis byersi (Westfall, 1957)
- Range map of the duckweed firetail (Telebasis byersi).

= Duckweed firetail =

Species of damselfly

The duckweed firetail (Telebasis byersi) is a small species of damselfly in the family Coenagrionidae. It occurs only in the United States, primarily the southeast.

== Description ==
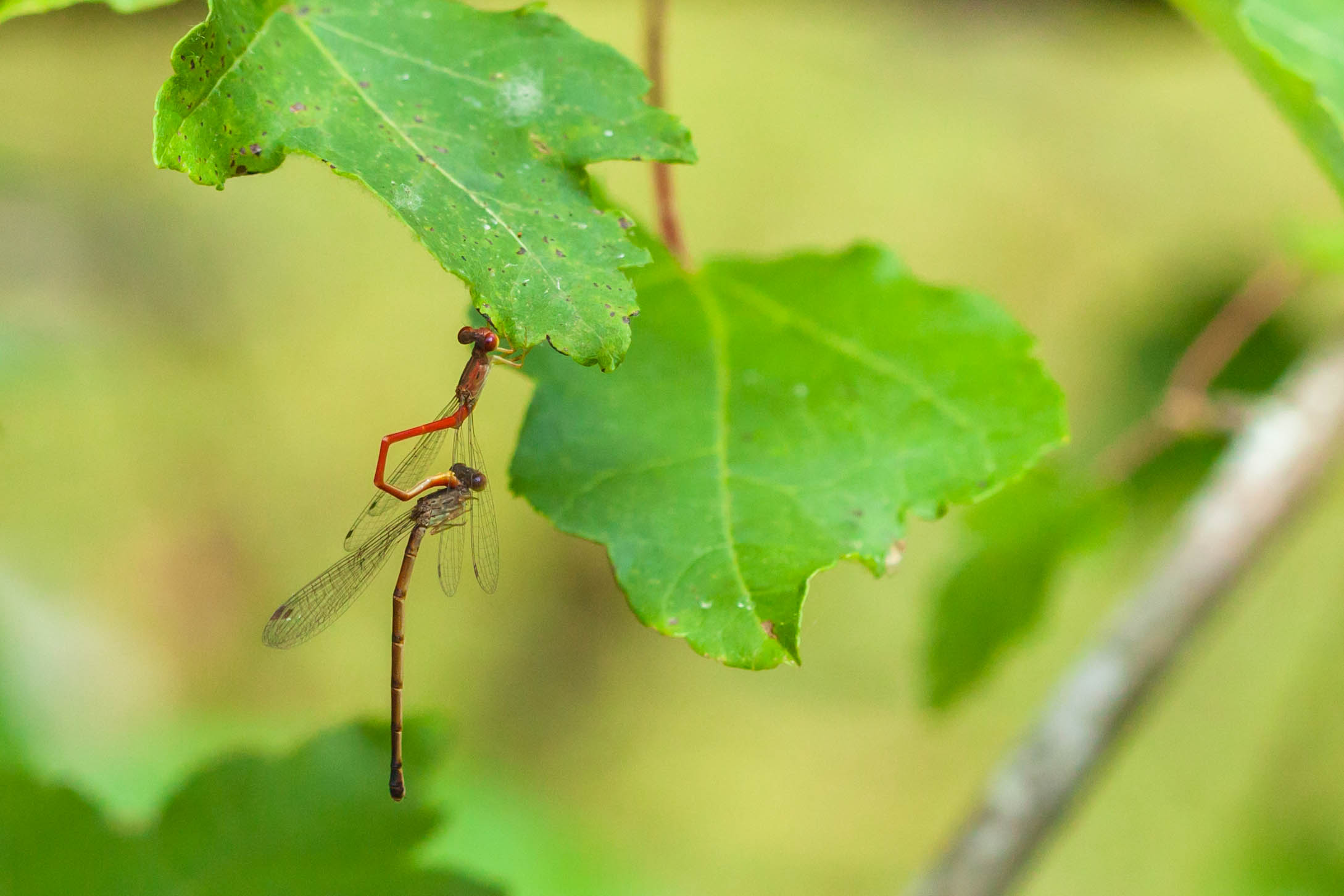
A male duckweed firetail grasping a female.

Telebasis byersi is a small pond damselfly. Adults are 25–31 millimetres (0.98–1.22 in) long. Adult males are bright red with some black markings on the head and thorax, with eyes red above and yellow below. Females are brown and tan. Nymphs are 13–16 millimetres (0.51–0.63 in) long and stocky, generally green or brown, with banding on the eyes and few other definite markings. The adult's red abdomen is visible through the skin on nymphs ready to emerge.

Adults are similar in appearance to Telebasis salva, but can be distinguished by range (except for a possible overlap in Texas). Nymphs may be distinguished from T. salva using various characters.

== Name ==
Its common name "duckweed firetail" refers to its habitat preference (duckweed-covered ponds) and its classification in Telebasis, the firetail damselflies. Its specific epithet byersi was chosen in honor of the entomologist C. F. Byers.

== Distribution ==
Telebasis byersi is found primarily along the United States east coast, from Maryland south to Florida. It also occurs, less commonly, from Louisiana and Texas north to Ohio.

Its range in North Carolina is expanding inland from the coastal plain into the Piedmont.

== Habitat ==
The duckweed firetail lives in swampy ponds or pools with carpets of duckweed, water lettuce, or other floating vegetation, and in swamps and sluggish streams. Nymphs can be found living in these floating vegetation masses. It may prefer areas where Eastern Pondhawks, a presumed predator, are not abundant.
