= Ghost fleet =

Ghost fleet or Ghost Fleet may refer to:

== Active vessels ==
- Ghost fleet, unofficial expression for a reserve fleet or a clandestine shadow fleet of military vehicles
- National Defense Reserve Fleet, managed by the US MARAD

== History ==
- Ghost Fleet of Mallows Bay, a fleet of ships in Mallows Bay after World War I
- Ghost Fleet of Truk Lagoon, a fleet of ships in Chuuk Lagoon during World War II
- Iran's ghost fleet, network of oil tankers, shell companies, and covert logistical operations used by the Islamic Republic of Iran to secretly export oil in defiance of international sanctions, primarily those imposed by the United States

== Media ==
- Ghost Fleet (novel) by P. W. Singer and August Cole

== See also ==
- Mallows Bay–Potomac River National Marine Sanctuary, which protects the "Ghost Fleet" in Mallows Bay
