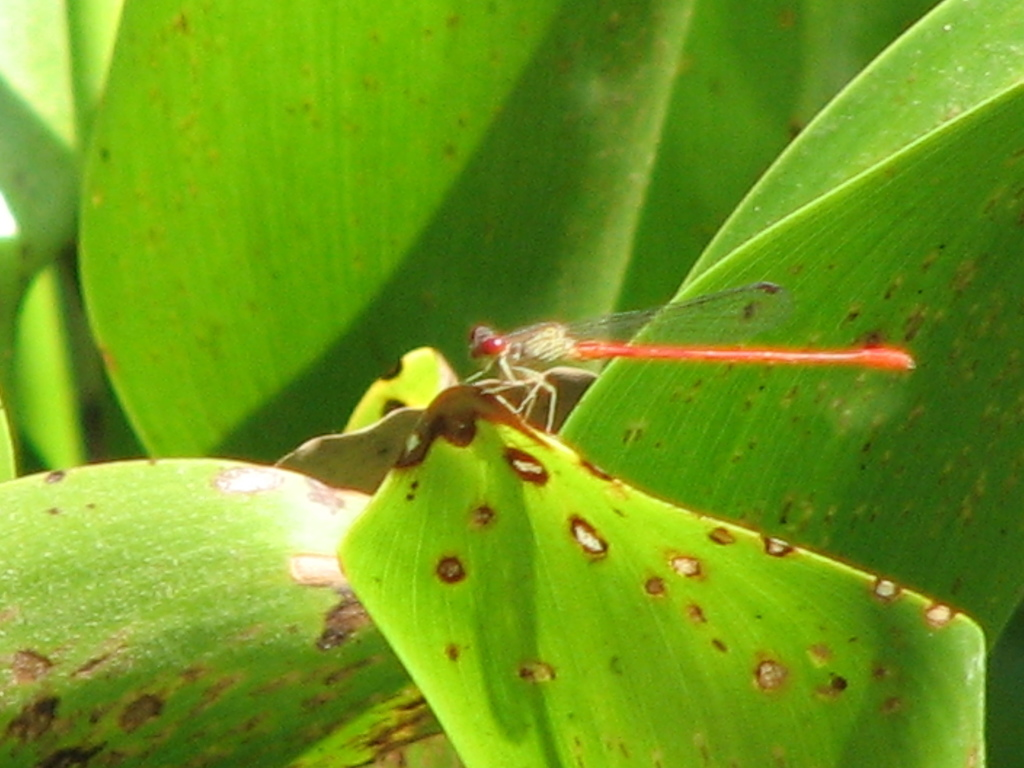

Conservation status
- Least Concern (IUCN 3.1)

Scientific classification
- Domain: Eukaryota
- Kingdom: Animalia
- Phylum: Arthropoda
- Class: Insecta
- Order: Odonata
- Suborder: Zygoptera
- Family: Coenagrionidae
- Genus: Telebasis
- Species: T. digiticollis

Binomial name
- Telebasis digiticollis Calvert, 1902

= Telebasis digiticollis =

Species of damselfly

Telebasis digiticollis, the marsh firetail, is a species of narrow-winged damselfly in the family Coenagrionidae. It is found in Central America.

The IUCN conservation status of Telebasis digiticollis is "LC", least concern, with no immediate threat to the species' survival. The population is stable.
