= Mallows Bay–Potomac River National Marine Sanctuary =

Marine sanctuary in the Potomac River

- IUCN category V (protected landscape/seascape)
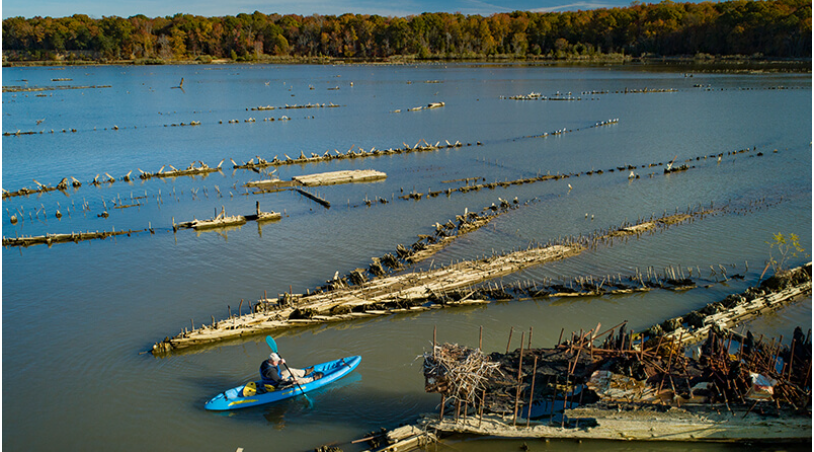
- A kayaker among the "Ghost Fleet" shipwrecks in Mallows Bay.

- Location within Maryland Location within the United States
- Location: Potomac River in Charles County, Maryland
- Nearest city: Nanjemoy, Maryland
- Coordinates: 38°28′21.4″N 77°16′6.9″W
- Area: 18 sq mi (47 km^{2})
- Established: September 3, 2019; 6 years ago
- Governing body: NOAA Office of National Marine Sanctuaries
- Website: sanctuaries.noaa.gov/mallows-potomac/

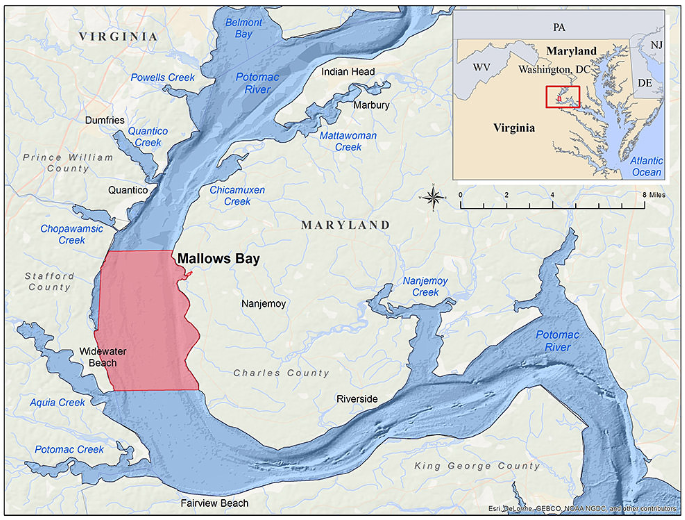
The Mallows Bay–Potomac River National Marine Sanctuary lies in the Potomac River in Charles County, Maryland.

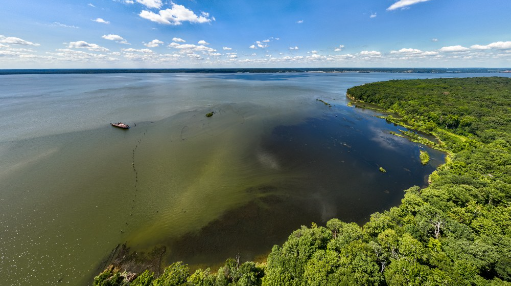
An aerial view of the shoreline of Mallows Bay looking toward the Potomac River.

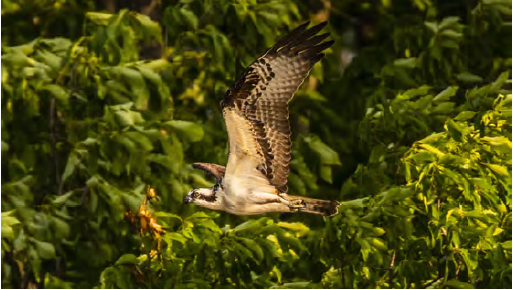
An osprey flies in the sanctuary.

The Mallows Bay–Potomac River National Marine Sanctuary is a National Marine Sanctuary in the United States located in the Potomac River in Charles County, Maryland. It is best known for the "Ghost Fleet", 118 historic shipwrecks in Mallows Bay in the sanctuary's northeast corner which is the largest shipwreck fleet in the Western Hemisphere. They are among more than 200 shipwrecks in the sanctuary, some of which date as far back as the American Revolutionary War and others to the American Civil War.

In addition to shipwrecks, the sanctuary preserves historical sites related to Native Americans, some of them as much as 12,000 years old, as well as a lengthy span of United States history, including the American Revolutionary War, the American Civil War, steamboat and steamship activity during the Industrial Revolution, and what was once an important Potomac River fishing industry. It also protects sites dating as far back as the 17th century related to African-American history, as well as an ecologically and biologically important area of the Potomac River and its Maryland shoreline that supports many species of plants and animals.

Designated on September 3, 2019, the Mallows Bay–Potomac River National Marine Sanctuary was the 14th national marine sanctuary, the first in the Chesapeake Bay watershed, and the first one designated since Thunder Bay National Marine Sanctuary in 2000.

== Description ==
The Mallows Bay–Potomac River National Marine Sanctuary is located in an 18-square-mile (47 km^{2}) portion of the Potomac River in Charles County, Maryland. It lies off the Nanjemoy Peninsula, about 40 miles (64 km) south of Washington, D.C.

The sanctuary stretches from the Charles County shoreline on the eastern side of the river to the border between Maryland and Virginia on the western side. The sanctuary's eastern boundary starts at a point just north of Sandy Point in Charles County and follows the Maryland shoreline of the Potomac River south around Mallows Bay, Blue Banks, and Wades Bay, cutting across the mouths of creeks and streams until it reaches a point just south of Smith Point. From there, the sanctuary's southern boundary crosses the Potomac River to the west in a straight line until it reaches a point just north of the mouth of Aquia Creek in Stafford County, Virginia, near Brent Point. The western boundary of the sanctuary approximates the border between the Commonwealth of Virginia and the State of Maryland along the western side of the Potomac River, continuing to the north and cutting across the mouths of streams and creeks until it reaches a point north of Tank Creek. The sanctuary's northern boundary then runs east across the Potomac River in a straight line until it intersects with the Maryland shoreline just north of Sandy Point. The Maryland-Virginia border, which also serves as both the boundary between Charles County and Virginia's Stafford County and the western boundary of the sanctuary, is demarcated by the mean low tide mark on the Virginia shoreline, placing nearly the entire river in Maryland and the entire sanctuary in Maryland waters in Charles County.

Public access to the sanctuary is primarily through Mallows Bay Park, a Charles County park adjacent to the sanctuary which offers direct access to the river, including Mallows Bay. Access is also possible from the Maryland shoreline via Smallwood State Park. Because the sanctuary's western boundary runs along the Virginia shoreline, visitors to Widewater State Park in Stafford County, Virginia, have easy access to the western edge of the sanctuary's Potomac River waters.

Mallows Bay was listed in the National Register of Historic Places on April 24, 2015, and the National Trust for Historic Preservation lists the area as a "National Treasure". The sanctuary is a part of the Southern Maryland National Heritage Area, and it lies along the Chesapeake Trail.

== Historical resources ==
=== Shipwrecks ===
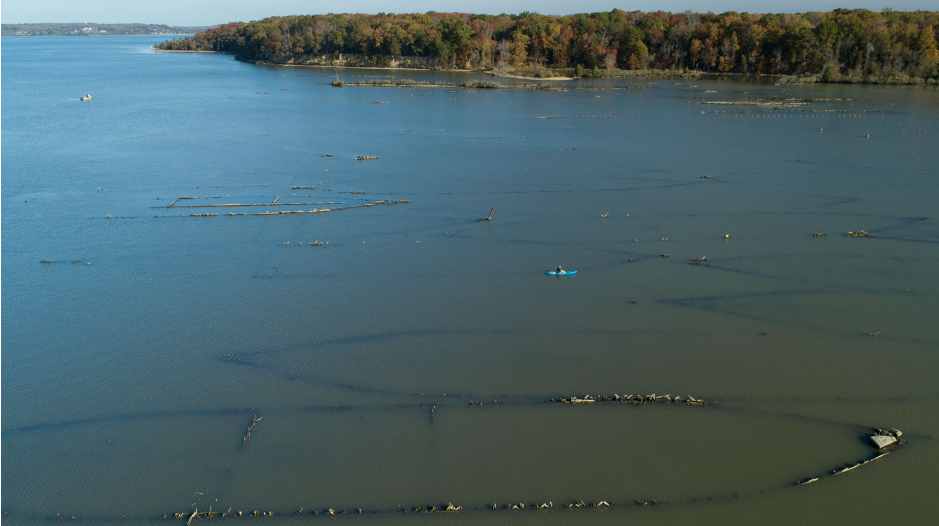
A kayaker among shipwrecks in Mallows Bay.

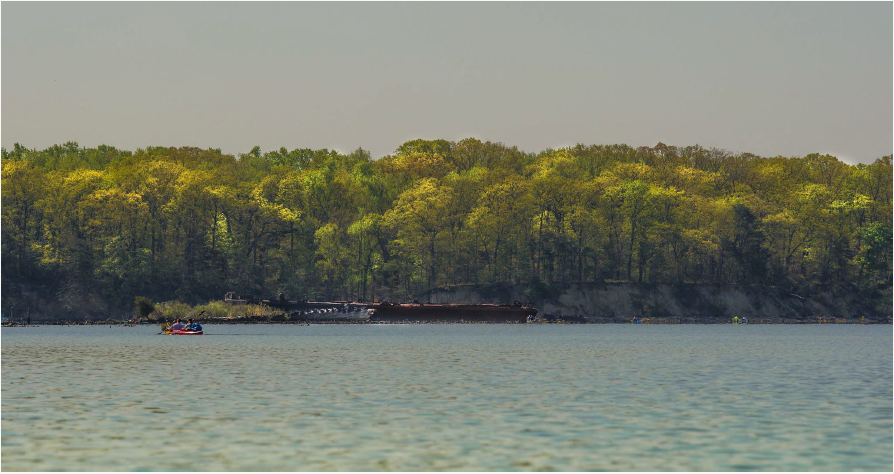
Shipwrecks and a kayak in the sanctuary.

The Mallows Bay–Potomac River National Marine Sanctuary includes more than 200 historic shipwrecks, some of them dating as far back as the American Revolutionary War (1775–1783) and others to the American Civil War (1861–1865). However, it is best known for a group of 118 partially submerged shipwrecks nicknamed the "Ghost Fleet" located in Mallows Bay in the sanctuary's northeastern corner. These wooden-hulled steamships were among nearly 300 built at more than 40 shipyards in 17 U.S. states by the United States Shipping Board's Emergency Fleet Corporation between 1917 and 1919, intended for use in World War I. None of the ships saw action during the war, which ended before the last of them was completed.

The Western Marine and Salvage Corporation of Alexandria, Virginia, bought most of the ships and anchored them in the Potomac River near Mallows Bay, bringing a few of them at a time up the river to Alexandria for scrapping and to salvage their steam engines, boilers, propellers, and other metal parts for scrap metal. On occasion the ships anchored near Mallows Bay while awaiting scrapping burned, broke loose, or otherwise became hazards to navigation, so authorities ordered the company to secure them. The company responded by burning many of them to the waterline, then floating them into Mallows Bay and scuttling them there. Western Marine and Salvage went bankrupt during the Great Depression, and after that local communities took over the task of salvaging valuable materials from the wrecks. After the United States entered World War II in December 1941, Bethlehem Steel began a third and final round of salvage that lasted for two years. When this was completed, 118 shipwrecks remained in shallow water in Mallows Bay, constituting the "Ghost Fleet", the largest shipwreck fleet in the Western Hemisphere.

Largely submerged during high tide, the shipwrecks emerge above the surface during low tide, and portions of some of them always are visible above the water's surface. Vegetation has grown on many of the shipwrecks in Mallows Bay, giving them the distinctive appearance of long, skinny islands.

Notable shipwrecks include MV Accomac (38°28′07.58″N 077°16′11.29″W), a former ferry abandoned at Mallows Bay in 1973 and the sanctuary's only steel-hulled wreck, and Afrania (38°28′23.34″N 077°15′57.378″W), Aowa (38°28′15.44″N 077°16′11.85″W), Bayou Teche (38°28′28.16″N 077°16′08.16″W), Benzonia (38°28′13.94″N 077°16′11.06″W), Boone (38°28′20.28″N 077°15′59.07″W), Dertona (38°28′27.84″N 077°16′00.37″W), Mono (38°28′23.95″N 077°16′13.94″W), Moosabee (38°28′28.16″N 077°16′02.89″W), Namecki (38°28′21.14″N 077°16′12.14″W), and Yawah (38°28′28.63″N 077°16′15.06″W), all of which were Emergency Fleet Corporation ships, and most or all of which have been in Mallows Bay since at least 1929.

Floods and storms occasionally move the shipwrecks, some of which lie in different places from their scuttling positions in the 1920s. In 2003, the storm surge from Hurricane Isabel lifted Benzonia's wreck off the bottom of Mallows Bay and deposited it on top of the wreck of SS Caribou, making Benzonia's wreck the most easily visible one in the Ghost Fleet as well as an important habitat for birds. Benzonia's wreck caught fire in 2013 and was extinguished by a vessel from the Prince William County, Virginia, fire department. In 2016 it burned again, with the fire smoldering for a over a week and substantially damaging the wreck, destroying much of its stern.

"Ghost Fleet" shipwrecks in Mallows Bay
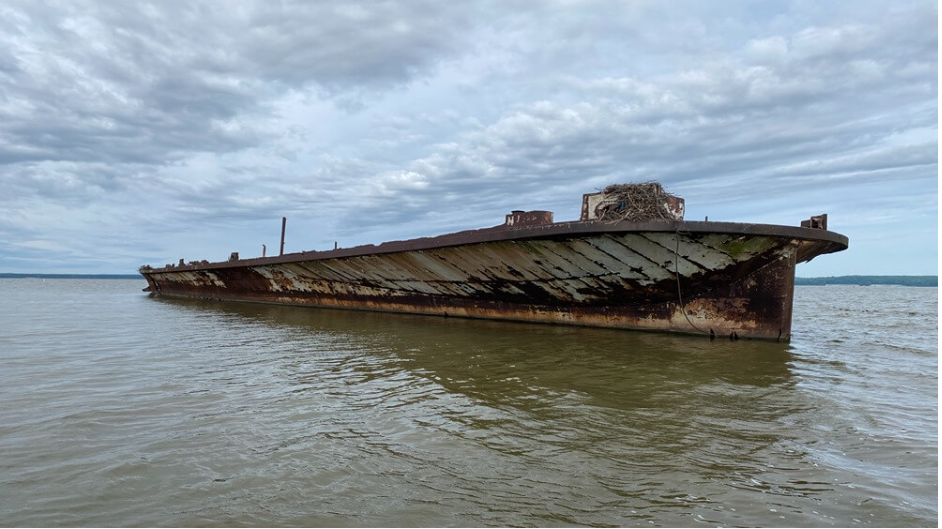
MV Accomac

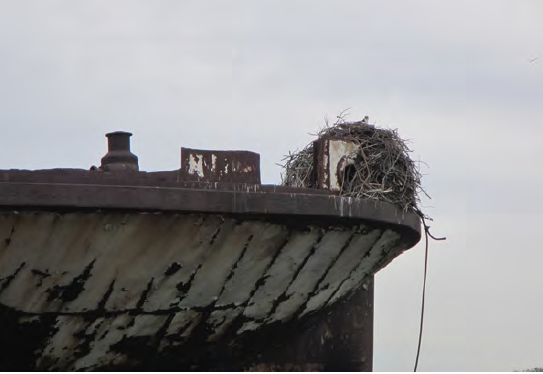
MV Accomacwith osprey nest at right

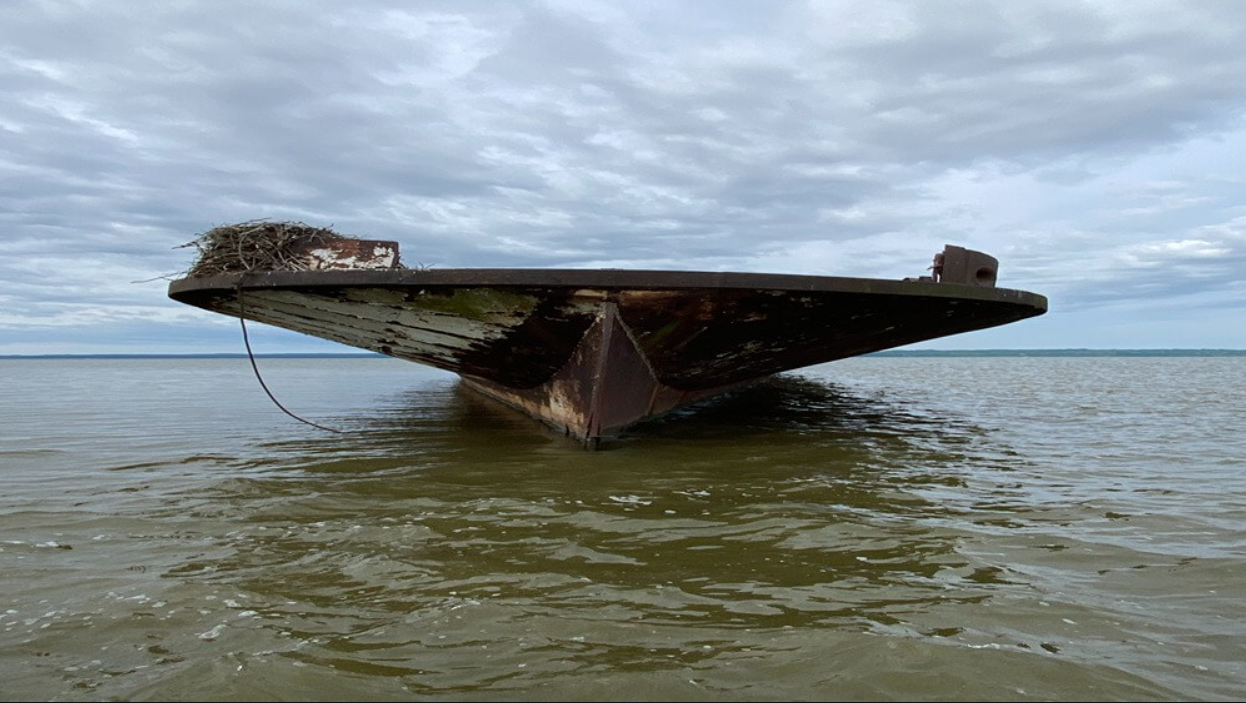
Bow view of MV Accomac with osprey nest at left

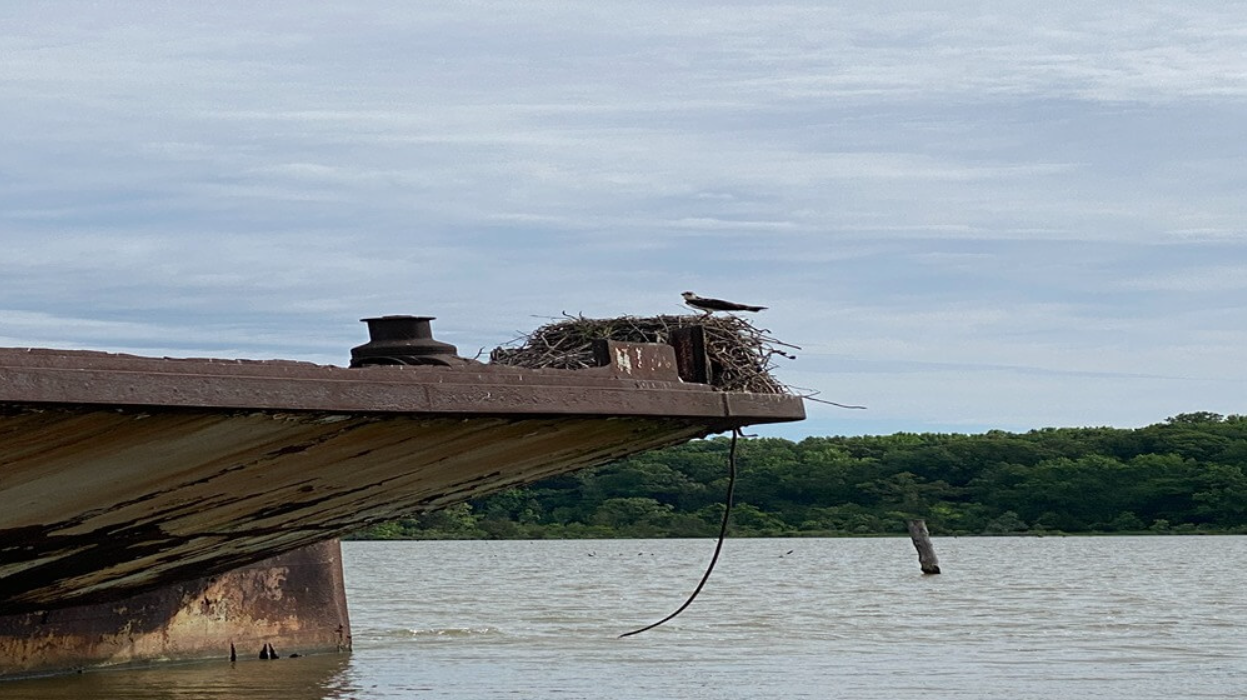
Starboard bow of MV Accomac with osprey on nest

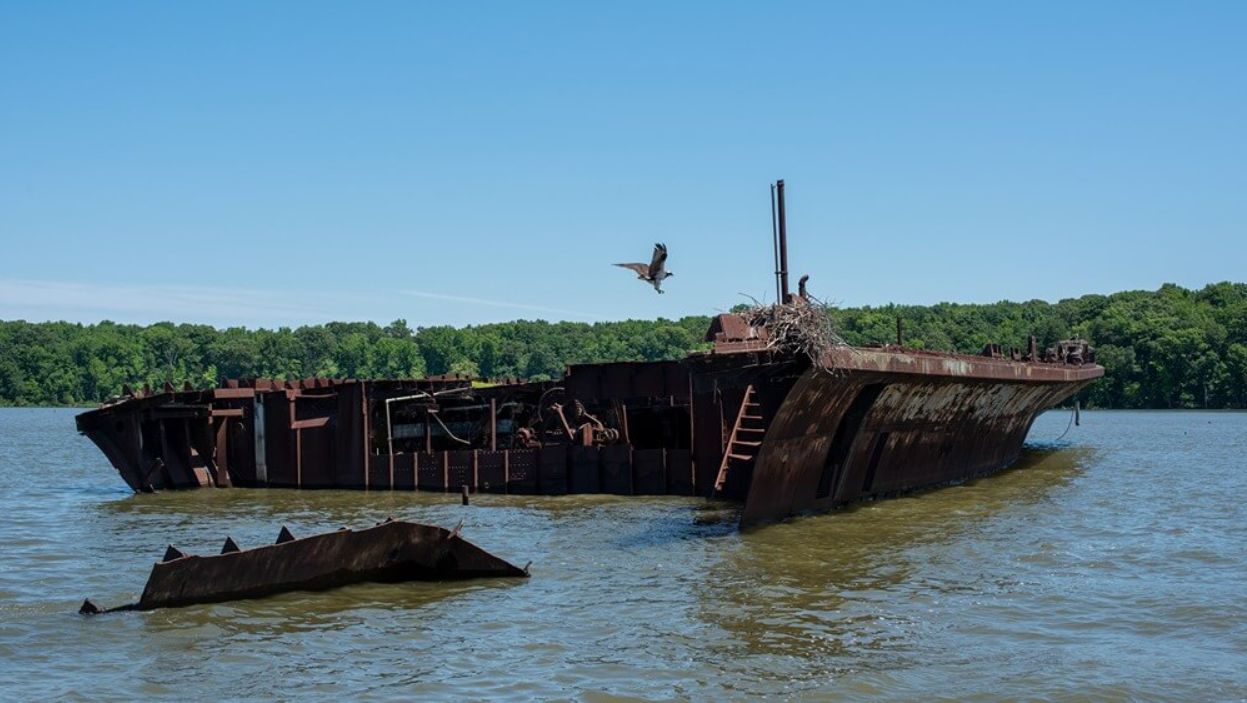
An osprey approaches its nest on the stern of MV Accomac

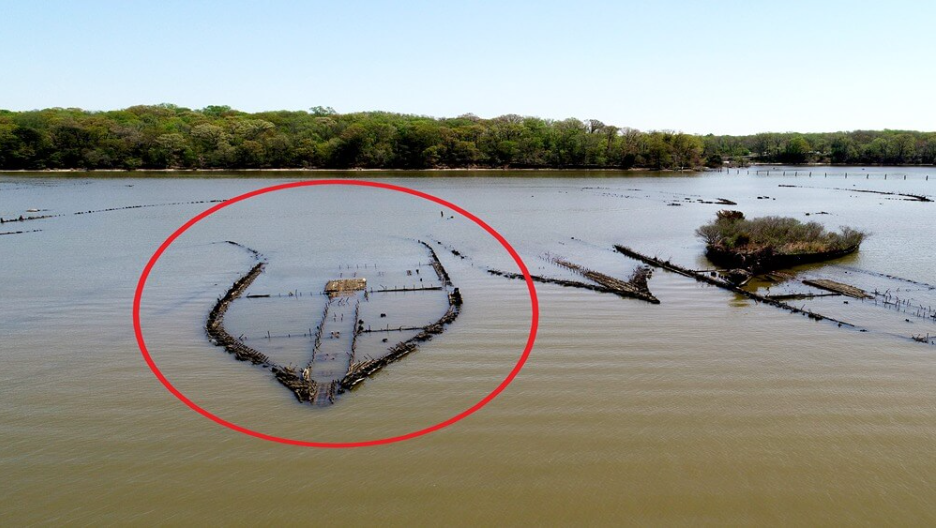
SS Aowa (circled in red); SS Benzonia (right) atop SS Caribou

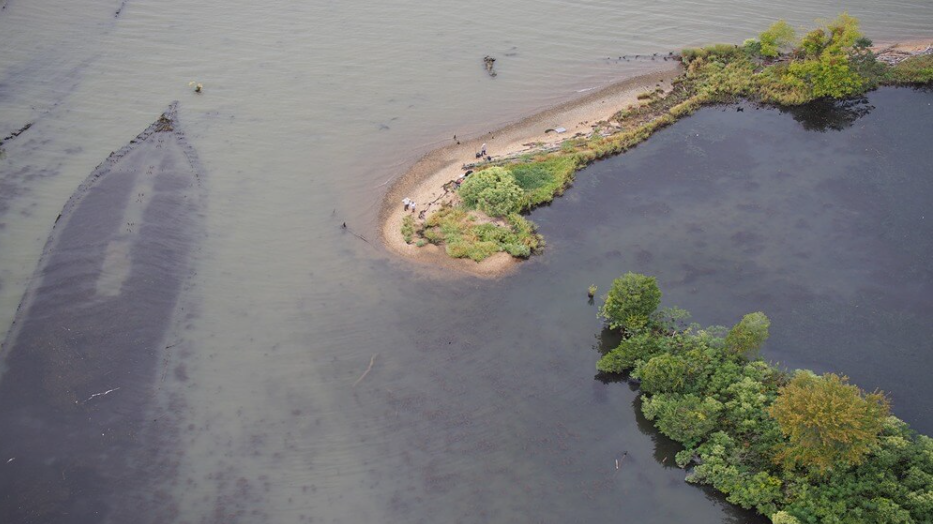
SS Bayou Teche (at left)

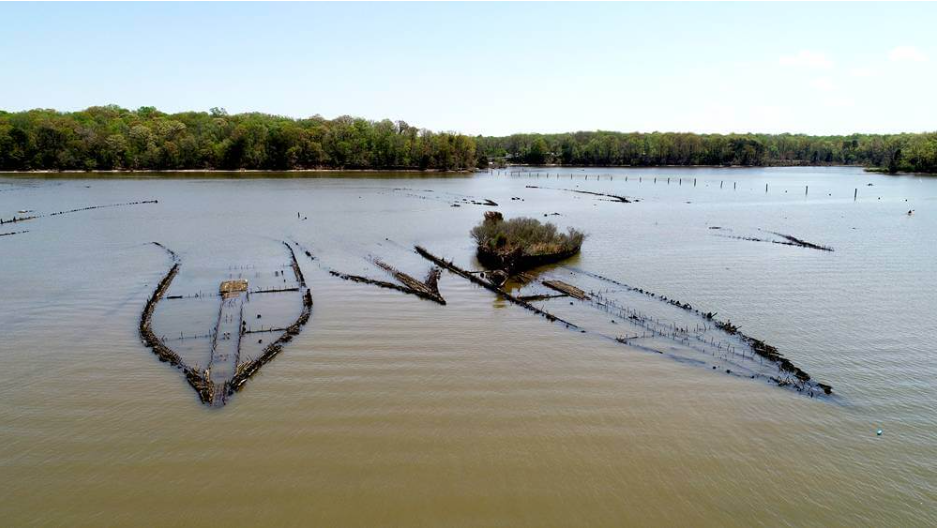
SS Benzonia (center, appearance of vegetation-covered island) atop SS Caribou; SS Aowa at left

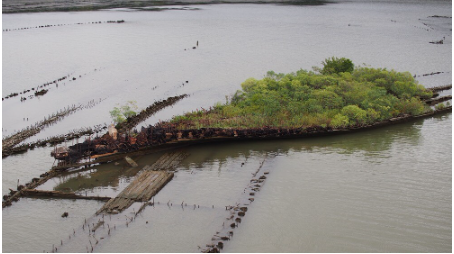
SS Benzonia (center, appearance of vegetation-covered island) atop SS Caribou

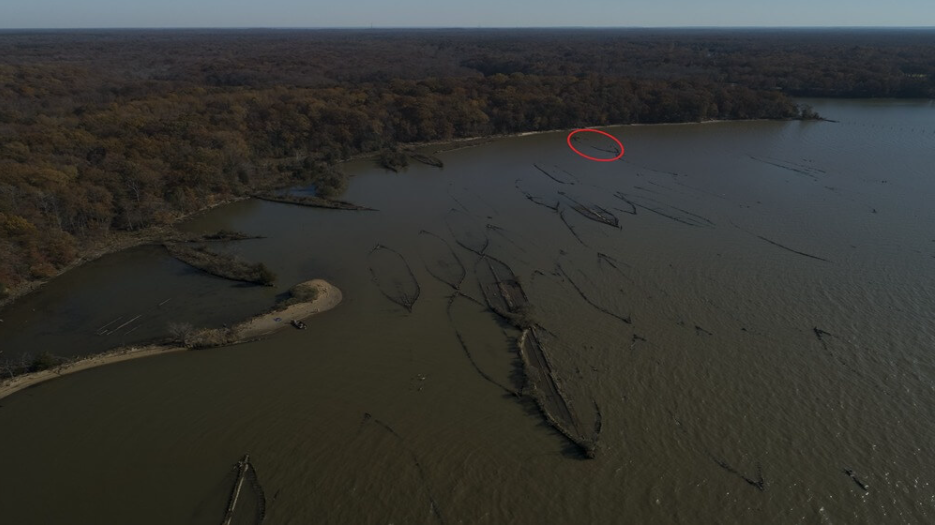
SS Boone (upper distance, circled in red)

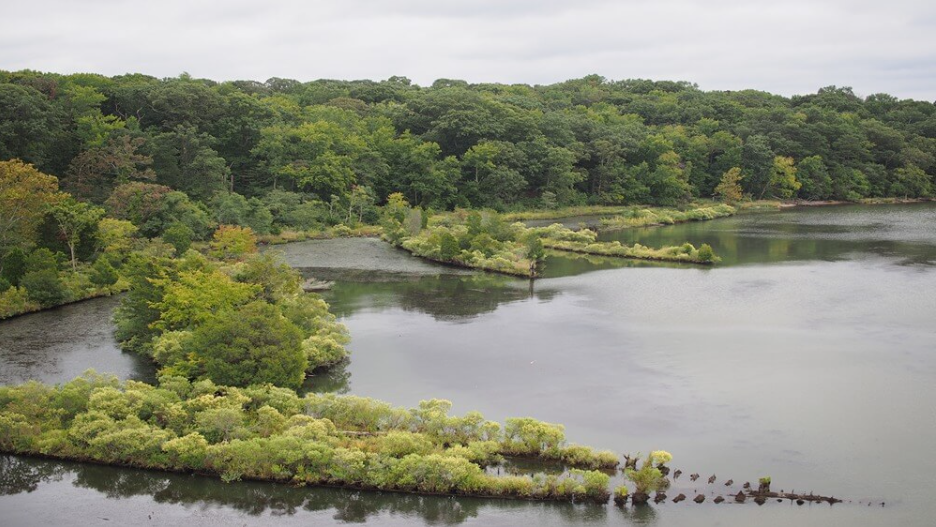
SS Dertona and SS Moosabee (both at lower left)

=== Native American history and culture ===
The stretch of the Potomac River in the Mallows Bay–Potomac River National Marine Sanctuary is part of the traditional homelands of the Native American Piscataway people of the Piscataway Conoy Tribe in Maryland and the Patawomeck people of the Patawomeck Indian Tribe of Virginia, to both of whom the area is of important cultural, historical, and spiritual significance. Historical artifacts dating as far back as 12,000 years have been discovered within the sanctuary. The Piscataway have identified Mallows Bay and Liverpool Point on the coast of Charles County as of particular cultural importance, and it is very likely that Nussamek, one of the villages the explorer John Smith visited during the summer of 1608, was in that area, although no submerged archaeological sites have been identified in the sanctuary's waters.

=== African-American history ===
The Mallows Bay–Potomac River National Marine Sanctuary includes sites important to African-American history. African Americans arrived on the sanctuary's shores as slaves centuries ago and have lived in the area ever since, fighting in the American Civil War and building some of the steamships now lying in Mallows Bay.

== Flora and fauna ==
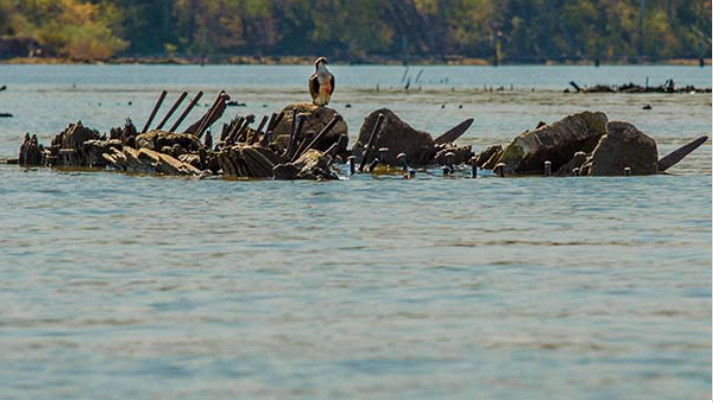
An osprey on a shipwreck in Mallows Bay.

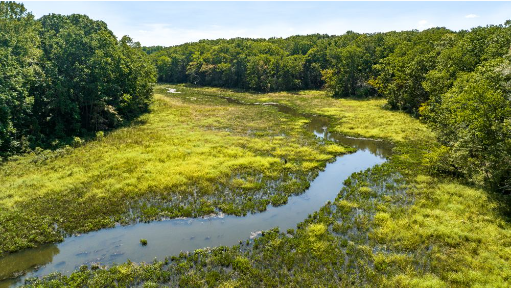
A creek runs through a tidal marsh in Mallows Bay Park.

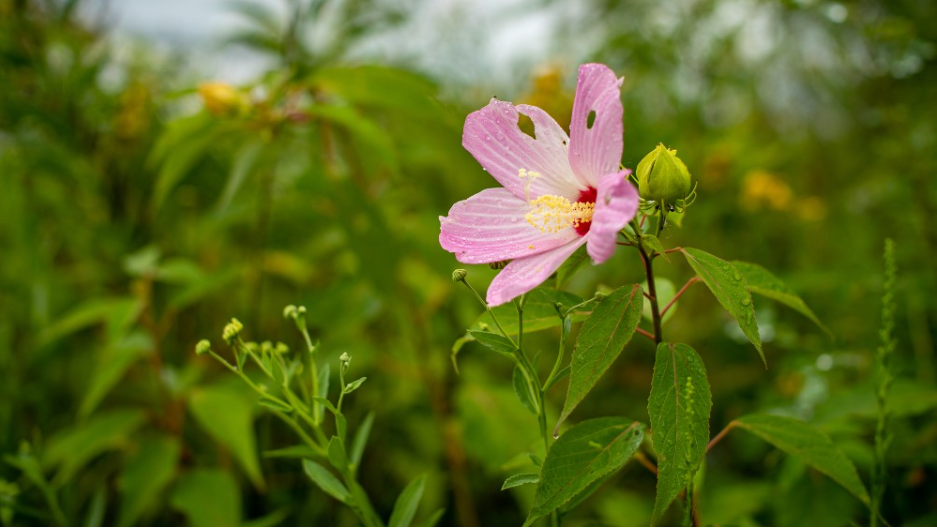
A swamp rose-mallow (Hibiscus moscheutos) in the sanctuary.

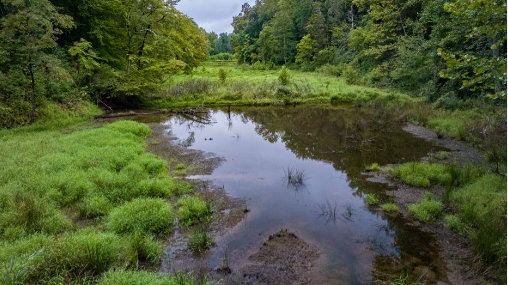
A wetland in Mallows Bay Park.

The Mallows Bay–Potomac River National Marine Sanctuary lies in an ecotone, a transition zone in the Potomac River where tides fluctuate between 1 and 2 feet (0.3 and 0.6 m) each day, mixing fresh water flowing into the sanctuary from farther up the river with salt water drawn northwards by the tides from the Chesapeake Bay. The water in the sanctuary is mostly fresh, and typically has a salinity level ranging from 0.1 to 0.5 parts per thousand. Fish found in the river's waters in the sanctuary include channel catfish, blue catfish, largemouth bass, river herring, striped bass, American shad, and Atlantic sturgeon.

Shallow waters near the sanctuary's shoreline contain large beds of submerged aquatic plants which grow each year from late spring through early fall. These weed beds include approximately ten different species of plant — including coontail of the genus Ceratophyllum, water stargrass (Heteranthera dubia), wild celery, and several species of naiad of the genus Najas — and are important spawning, nursery, and feeding grounds for juvenile fish, crustaceans, mollusks, and other animals.

Over time, the shipwrecks of the "Ghost Fleet' have transformed into distinctive, skinny, vegetation-covered artificial islands which provide island, intertidal, and underwater habitats that support a diversity of coastal and marine life, including an abundance of fish, American beavers, and birds such as ospreys, great blue herons, and bald eagles. Sediment and seeds deposited inside the hulls of the wrecks have turned some of them into islands often referred to as "flowerpot" wrecks, while others have fused to the shore and form artificial peninsulas which stabilize the shoreline and have a lush covering of plant life. Eastern redcedar (Juniperus virginiana), paw paws of the genus Asimina, persimmon trees, marsh tickseed (Bidens trichosperma), and pickerel weed of the genus Pontederia grow on the wrecks, providing a home for various animal species including ospreys, who visit the sanctuary each spring and summer and build their nests on the wrecks. At least one beaver lodge has been noted on a wreck. Vegetation on the wreck of SS Afrania includes swamp dogwood (Cornus amomum), yellow iris (Iris pseudacorus), drooping star of Bethlehem (Ornithogalum nutans), false indigo (Amorpha fruticosa), and a 33-foot (10 m) tall American elm (Ulmus americana).

A great variety of freshwater aquatic plants grows in the tidal marshes at the mouths of streams that flow into the Potomac River along the sanctuary's Maryland shoreline, where they absorb nutrients from runoff water, provide feeding grounds for many animal species, and prevent erosion of the shore. Broad-leaved emergent plants dominate these habitats, including green arrow arum (Peltandra virginica), pickerel weed, and spatterdock (Nuphar advena) at lower elevations and jewelweed of the genus Impatiens and wild rice at higher ones. Swamp rose-mallow (Hibiscus moscheutos), which may have inspired the name of Mallows Bay, and later a part of the name of the sanctuary as a whole, also grows in the tidal marshes.

American beavers are active along the shoreline and just inland from it in Mallows Bay Park just outside the sanctuary, where their multi-year cyclic pattern of constructing lodges and dams on streams flowing into the sanctuary create and maintain wetlands that prevent flooding and erosion in and around the sanctuary. In beaver ponds in these wetlands, floating plants such as duckweed of the subfamily Lemnoideae, pondweed, spatterdock, and white water lily (Nymphaea odorata) grow in open water and cattails of the genus Typha, pickerel weed, rice cutgrass (Leersia oryzoides), and sedges of the family Cyperaceae border the ponds.

The habitats in the Potomac River and along the Maryland shoreline protected by the sanctuary are home to many species of animal in addition to American beavers, bald eagles, great blue herons, ospreys, and the various fish species in the Potomac River. Among other animal species commonly found in and near the sanctuary are double-crested cormorants, white-tailed deer, raccoons, northern watersnakes, northern red-bellied cooters, eastern box turtles, green frogs (Lithobates clamitans), spring peepers, American toads, spotted salamanders, zebra swallowtail butterflies, eastern pondhawks (Erythemis simplicicollis), and bumble bees.

Common species in the Mallows Bay–Potomac River National Marine Sanctuary

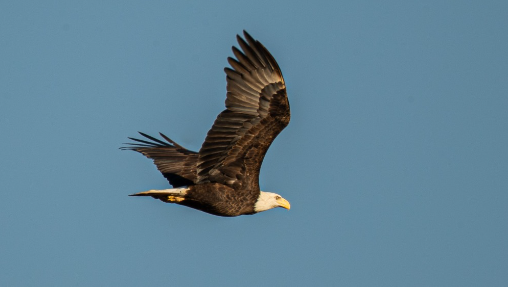
Bald eagle

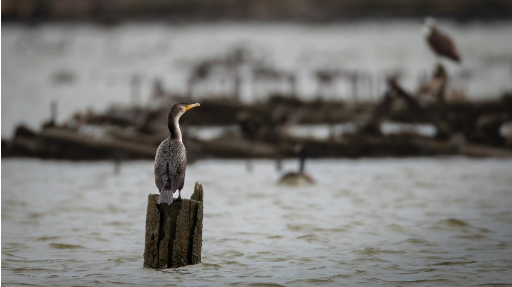
Double-crested cormorant on a piling in Mallows Bay

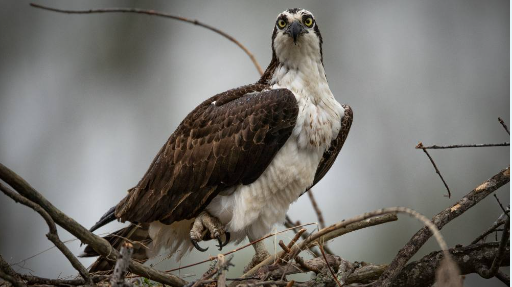
Osprey

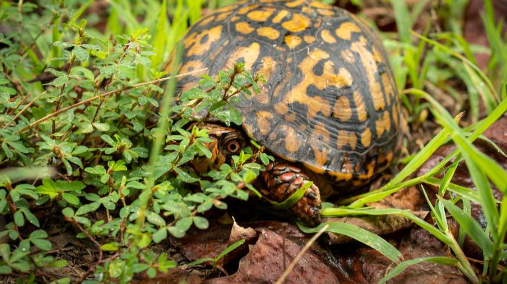
Eastern box turtle

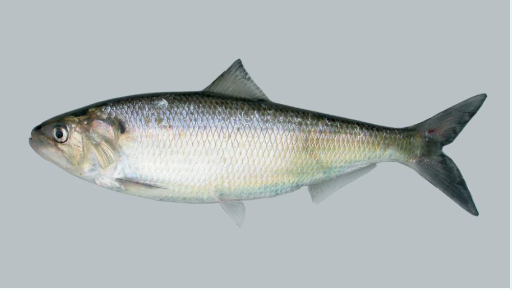
American shad

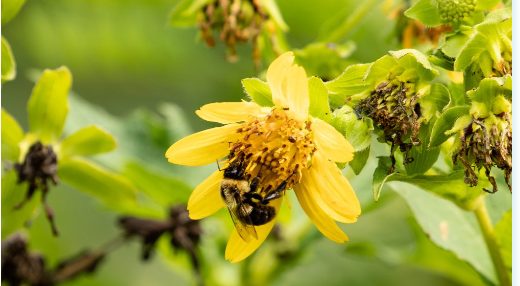
Bumblebee

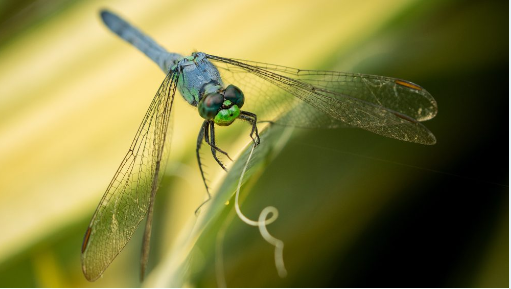
Eastern pondhawk (Erythemis simplicicollis)

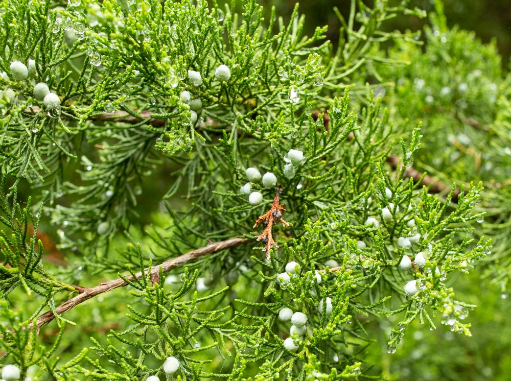
Eastern redcedar

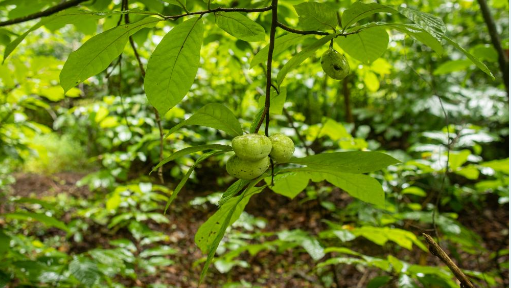
Paw paw (genus Asimina)

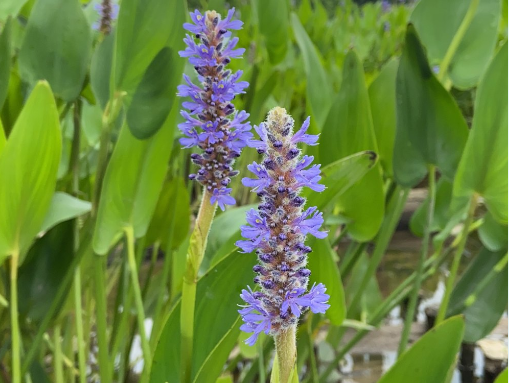
Pickerel weed (genus Pontederia)

=== Endangered species ===
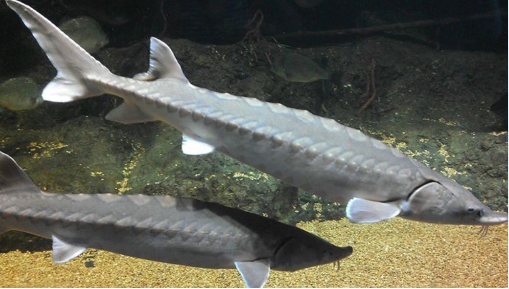
Atlantic sturgeon

The Atlantic sturgeon is considered an endangered species and enjoys protection by the United States Government. The National Marine Fisheries Service has designated most of the tidal Potomac River, including the waters of the Mallows Bay–Potomac River National Marine Sanctuary, as a critical habitat for the Atlantic sturgeon, which uses freshwater coastal environments like the ones found in the sanctuary as spawning grounds and nursery habitats.

=== Invasive species ===
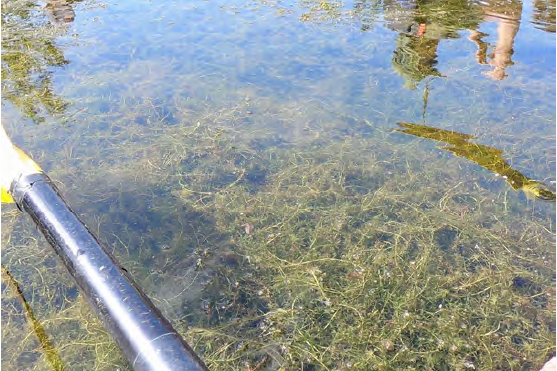
A thick bed of Hydrilla in the sanctuary.

Hydrilla is a genus of aquatic plant native to Africa, Asia, and Australia which has become a naturalized invasive species in the United States. Introduced into the Potomac River in the 1970s and 1980s, it has been found to have beneficial effects in the Chesapeake Bay, where it is protected. However, it is dominant in the Mallows Bay–Potomac River National Marine Sanctuary's waters, where it can grow very thickly, block sunlight, and crowd out native plants, as well as obscure submerged historical resources.

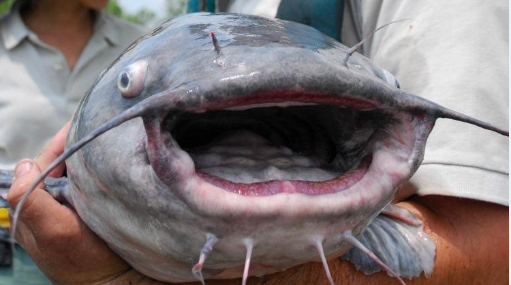
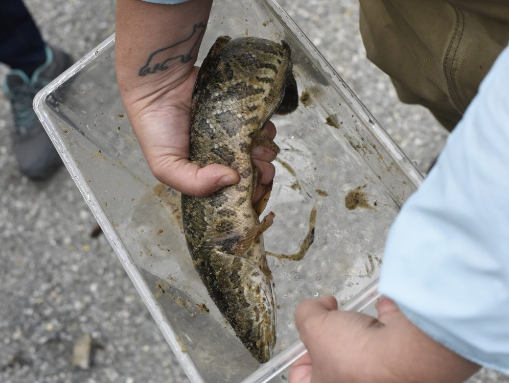
LEFT: Blue catfish. RIGHT: Northern snakehead.

The blue catfish also is an invasive species. Introduced into the Chesapeake Bay in the 1970s, it has spread up the Potomac River and through the sanctuary's waters. It threatens many economically and ecologically important species in the Chesapeake Bay and its tributaries, such as the Potomac River.

The northern snakehead, native to East Asia, was first found in the Chesapeake Bay watershed in 2002. It has established itself in the Potomac River, where it has been caught since 2004, and is another invasive species of fish found in the sanctuary.

Drooping star of Bethlehem (Ornithogalum nutans), found on the wreck of SS Afrania, is reported as invasive in the Mid-Atlantic region of the United States, where it crowds out native plants on the floors of forests.

== Climate change concerns ==
In November 2020 the National Oceanic and Atmospheric Administration (NOAA) published a study describing its concerns about the possible impacts of climate change on the Mallows Bay–Potomac River National Marine Sanctuary. NOAA listed the following possible impacts:

- Projections indicate that by 2035 air temperatures in the sanctuary could be 3.6 °F (2 °C) higher than in colonial times, heating waters arriving from upstream. Between 2020 and 2100, water temperatures in the Chesapeake Bay could rise by 10 °F (5.6 °C), resulting in warmer tidal waters entering the sanctuary. Warmer air and water temperatures would speed both biological and chemical deterioration of both the above-water and submerged portions of the sanctuary's shipwrecks.
- Between 2020 and 2100, sea level rise and subsidence of the shoreline could combine to cause the tidal Potomac River to rise 7.9 feet (2.4 m), submerging the sanctuary's boat launch and kayak ramp and a local beach.
- Even a 3-foot (0.9 m) rise in Atlantic Ocean levels would lead to a 6-inch (15 cm) increase in tidal ranges in the sanctuary, resulting in more wetting and drying of the wooden structures of shipwrecks which will accelerate their deterioration.
- Stronger storms could lead to higher storm surges in the sanctuary. In addition, flooding with waters reaching 1.75 feet (0.5 m) above mean high water, which occurred on an average of 10 days per year in 2020, could increase to 100 days per year by 2050 and become daily by 2100 due to heavier rainfall. Moreover, large flooding events — so-called "100-year floods" — could become annual by 2100. Floods can damage the sanctuary's resources through erosion, by felling trees, and by moving things such as shipwrecks and pushing them against obstacles as well as by pummeling them with debris. Although floods can help preserve cultural resources by burying them in sediments, they also can uncover resources and leave them exposed and prone to faster deterioration.
- Ocean acidification increased by 30 percent between 1750 and 2020. The effects of ocean acidification on sanctuary waters are difficult to predict, as upstream runoff into the Potomac River could either add to or at least partially mitigate the acidification of water arriving in the sanctuary via the tides. Although greater acidification's possible impact on other cultural and historical resources also is unclear, it would accelerate the deterioration of the shipwrecks, particularly the steel-hulled Accomac and the steel bolts and cross-strapping that hold the wooden-hulled wrecks together.
- Invasive species could benefit from climate change, resulting in new invasive species reaching the sanctuary and extant ones having greater competitive advantages over native species. Submerged aquatic vegetation like invasive Hydrilla, however, can mitigate at least some of the effects of tidal action and flooding in the sanctuary by slowing the movement of water and reduce acidification by absorbing large amounts of carbon dioxide. Shipworms, known in the Chesapeake Bay since 1878, are unlikely to reach the sanctuary because of the cooler temperature and lower salinity of its waters, but higher water temperatures and greater salinity levels resulting from sea level rise could create conditions in the sanctuary favorable for shipworms. A shipworm population could inflict significant damage on the wooden-hulled shipwrecks.

== Monitoring and research ==
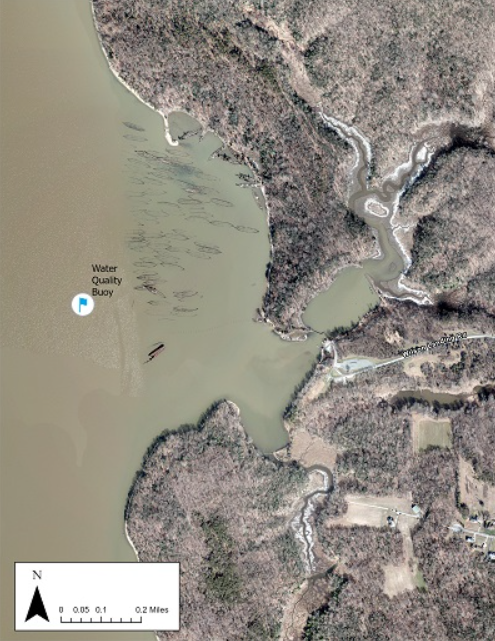
Location of the water quality buoy. "Ghost Fleet" shipwrecks in Mallows Bay also are visible.

In 2018, a partnership of NOAA and the Maryland Department of Natural Resources purchased and began operating a water quality buoy adjacent to Mallows Bay. It operates each year from April through October and reports real-time measurements of water temperature, salinity, dissolved oxygen, pH, clarity, and chlorophyll levels (an indirect measure of algae concentration), as well as meteorological data such as air temperature, barometric pressure, and wind speed and direction. The buoy's data is of use to scientists and resource managers assessing environmental changes, which aids them in decision-making and other ecological restoration and historical preservation efforts. The data also aid people involved in commercial fishing, recreational fishing, and local tourism as well as visitors planning trips to the sanctuary.

The water quality buoy has an acoustic telemetry receiver attached to it which can detect and record transmissions made by tags attached to passing fish, allowing the sanctuary's staff in partnership with the Smithsonian Environmental Research Center and the Mid-Atlantic Acoustic Telemetry Observation System to collect information on fish movements useful in analysis of fish migration patterns, habitat use, and survival rates.

In the summer of 2020, the National Marine Sanctuary Foundation and the Potomac Riverkeeper Network established a partnership to create a citizen science monitoring program at Mallows Bay. It focuses on bacterial contamination of the water important to human health.

In the summer of 2022, the sanctuary began a partnership with the Maryland Department of Natural Resources and the Chesapeake Bay SAV Watchers to conduct an annual sampling of submerged aquatic vegetation (SAV) in the sanctuary. The annual sampling provides researchers with a better understanding of species diversity and density in the sanctuary.

== Recreation and tourism ==
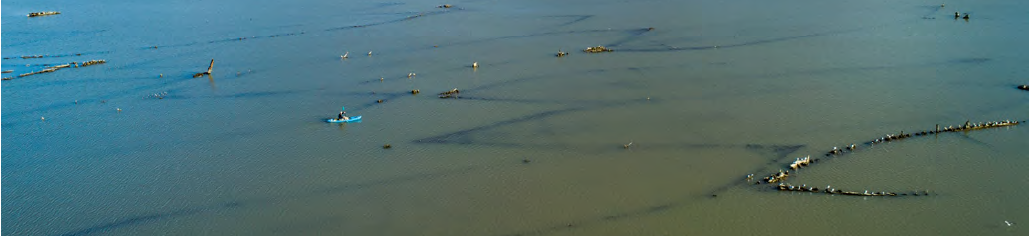
A kayaker among the shipwrecks in Mallows Bay.

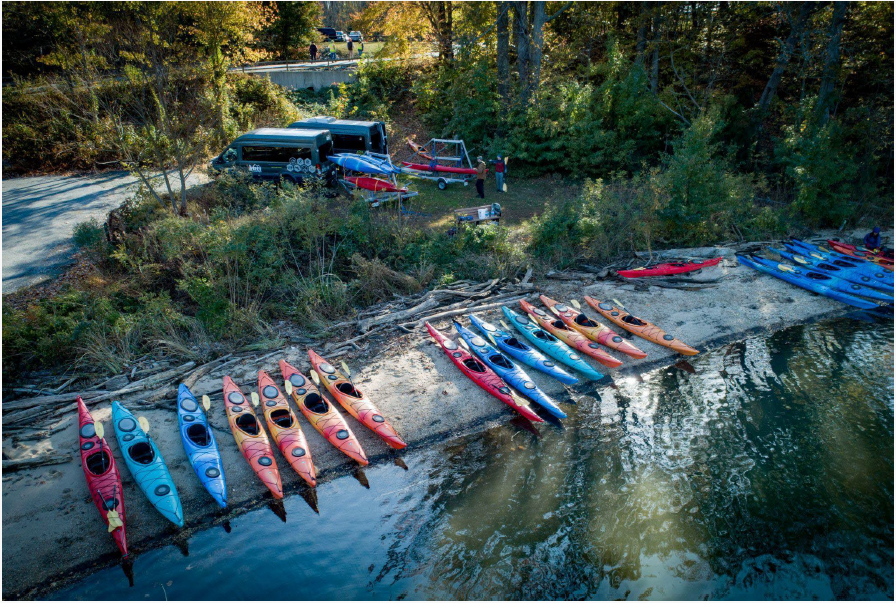
Kayaks await visitors at the sanctuary.

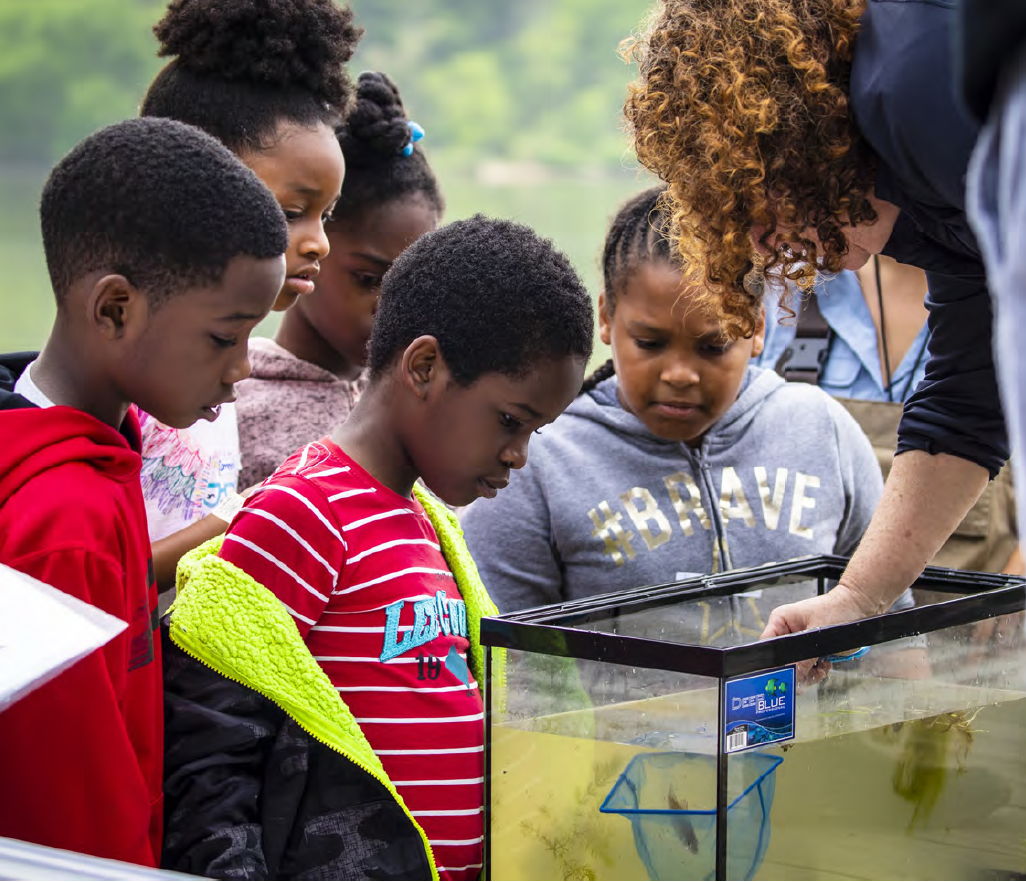
Students visit the sanctuary.

The Mallows Bay–Potomac River National Marine Sanctuary is a popular area for recreational fishing and ecotourism. Paddling, including kayaking, among the shipwrecks in Mallows Bay is a common activity.

== Education ==
The Mallows Bay–Potomac River National Marine Sanctuary offers a variety of free educational programs for students and teachers. Topics covered include science and technology, the natural environment, and history and heritage.

== Designation history ==
The designation process for the Mallows Bay–Potomac River National Marine Sanctuary began on September 16, 2014, when Governor of Maryland Martin O'Malley submitted to the National Oceanic and Atmospheric Administration (NOAA) a nomination of the area for sanctuary status on behalf of the State of Maryland, Charles County, and a wide variety of community groups. The nomination advocated the sanctuary's creation to protect the historic shipwrecks and cultural heritage resources in the area, foster partnerships with educational and research groups and institutions, and improve public access, tourism, and economic development. Maryland's delegation in the United States Congress strongly supported the nomination, which also received broad support from a wide variety of organizations and the community in general.

After completing its review of the nomination, NOAA added the area to the inventory of nominations that are eligible for designation on January 12, 2015. On October 7, 2015, NOAA initiated the public scoping process by publishing a Notice of Intent in the Federal Register soliciting public input on the proposed designation and informing the public of NOAA's intentions to prepare a draft environmental impact statement evaluating alternatives related to the proposed designation of the sanctuary. A three-month public comment period followed, during which NOAA solicited additional input on the scale and scope of the proposed sanctuary, including ideas presented in the community nomination. In November 2015, NOAA held two public meetings and provided additional opportunities for public comments by mail and through a web portal. The comment period closed on January 15, 2016. NOAA used the public scoping comments in preparing regulations for the proposed sanctuary, the draft environmental impact statement, and other documents, all in close consultation with the State of Maryland.

On January 9, 2017, NOAA announced the proposed designation of waters in the tidal Potomac River as a national marine sanctuary, offering four alternatives:

- Create no sanctuary.
- Create a sanctuary encompassing 18 square miles (47 km^{2}) of the Potomac River, closely matching the boundaries of the Mallows Bay–Widewater Historical and Archeological District on the National Register of Historic Places.
- Create a sanctuary encompassing 52 square miles (135 km^{2}) of the Potomac River, including all known remains of World War I-era ships.
- Create a sanctuary encompassing 100 square miles (259 km^{2}) of the Potomac River, including additional areas which may contain other maritime cultural heritage assets and could expand opportunities for recreational use of the area.

NOAA indicated the 52-square-mile (135 km^{2}) option as its preferred alternative. An 81-day public comment period on the proposal followed and closed on March 31, 2017. During the comment period, NOAA also held two separate public meetings, one in La Plata, Maryland, on March 7, 2017. and one in Arnold, Maryland, on March 9, 2017. Based on comments during this period, as well as internal NOAA deliberations, discussions with state-recognized Native American tribes, consultation with the United States Department of the Navy (which cooperated in the preparation of the environmental impact statement on behalf of four military facilities in the area), meetings with constituent groups, and an evaluation of these inputs with the State of Maryland and Charles County, NOAA chose the 18-square-mile (47 km^{2}) alternative for the proposed sanctuary.

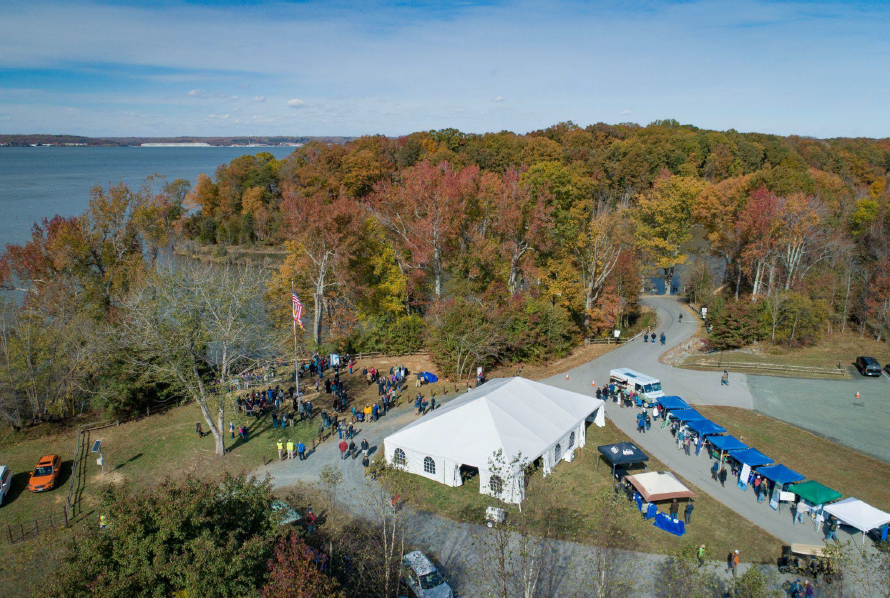
The sanctuary's designation ceremony in September 2019.

NOAA, the State of Maryland, and Charles County jointly announced the creation of the sanctuary on July 8, 2019. Following a mandatory wait for 45 days of U.S. Congressional session to pass after publication of the announcement in the Federal Register that day, the sanctuary's designation took effect on September 3, 2019.

== Administration ==
NOAA, the State of Maryland, and Charles County jointly manage the Mallows Bay–Potomac River National Marine Sanctuary. NOAA's management responsibilities are focused primarily on the protection of shipwrecks and maritime heritage resources related to them. The Maryland Department of Natural Resources and a multi-state agency, the Potomac River Fisheries Commission, manage the sanctuary's natural resources.

NOAA established a Sanctuary Advisory Council for the Mallows Bay–Potomac River National Marine Sanctuary in 2020. It is composed of 15 members and 15 alternates who represent various stakeholders in the sanctuary's affairs, including education, marine archaeology, maritime history, research, fishing, recreational, tourism, cultural resource, and economic development interests as well as the community at large. The council also has non-voting seats for representatives of six government agencies, two Native American tribes, and one Native American nation. The council provides advice on sanctuary operations to the sanctuary superintendent.
