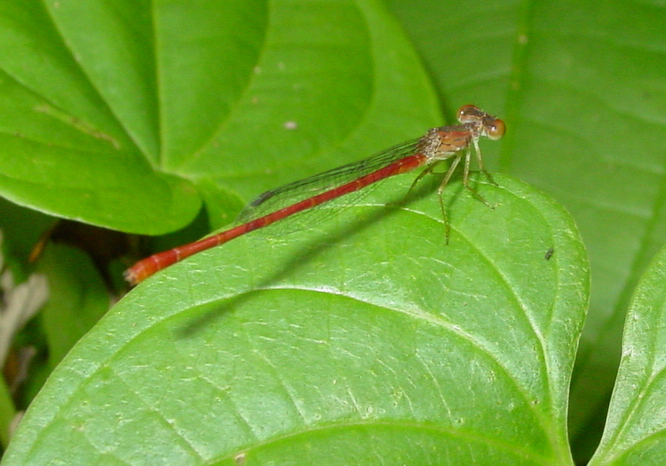
- Telebasis byersi

Scientific classification
- Kingdom: Animalia
- Phylum: Arthropoda
- Clade: Pancrustacea
- Class: Insecta
- Order: Odonata
- Suborder: Zygoptera
- Family: Coenagrionidae
- Genus: Telebasis; Selys, 1865

= Telebasis =

Genus of damselflies

Telebasis is a genus of damselflies in the family Coenagrionidae. The genus occurs in the Neotropics. Most of the species are red with a few blue species in South America.

This genus contains the following species:

- Telebasis abuna Bick & Bick, 1995
- Telebasis aurea May, 1992
- Telebasis bastiaani Bick & Bick, 1996
- Telebasis bickorum Daigle, 2002
- Telebasis boomsmae Garrison, 1994
- Telebasis brevis Bick & Bick, 1995
- Telebasis byersi Westfall, 1957 - Duckweed Firetail
- Telebasis carmesina Calvert, 1909
- Telebasis carminita Calvert, 1909
- Telebasis carota Kennedy, 1936
- Telebasis carvalhoi Garrison, 2009
- Telebasis celiovallei Machado, 2010
- Telebasis coccinea (Selys, 1876)
- Telebasis collopistes Calvert, 1902
- Telebasis corallina (Selys, 1876)
- Telebasis corbeti Garrison, 2009
- Telebasis demarara (Williamson, 1917)
- Telebasis digiticollis Calvert, 1902
- Telebasis divaricata Machado, 2010
- Telebasis dominicana (Selys in Sagra, 1857)
- Telebasis dunklei Bick & Bick, 1995
- Telebasis erythrina (Selys, 1876)
- Telebasis farcimentum Garrison, 2009
- Telebasis filiola (Perty, 1834)
- Telebasis flammeola Kennedy, 1936
- Telebasis garleppi Ris, 1918
- Telebasis garrisoni Bick & Bick, 1995
- Telebasis gigantea Daigle, 2002
- Telebasis griffinii (Martin, 1896)
- Telebasis inalata (Calvert, 1961)
- Telebasis incolumis Williamson & Williamson, 1930 - Oasis Firetail
- Telebasis isthmica Calvert, 1902
- Telebasis lenkoi Machado, 2010
- Telebasis leptocyclia Garrison, 2009
- Telebasis levis Garrison, 2009
- Telebasis livida Kennedy, 1936
- Telebasis milleri Garrison, 1997
- Telebasis myrianae Machado, 2010
- Telebasis obsoleta (Selys, 1876)
- Telebasis pallida Machado, 2010
- Telebasis paraensei Machado, 1956
- Telebasis pareci Machado, 2010
- Telebasis pataxo Machado, 2010
- Telebasis racenisi Bick & Bick, 1995 - Selva Firetail
- Telebasis rubricauda Bick & Bick, 1995 - Red-and-blue Firetail
- Telebasis salva (Hagen, 1861) - Desert Firetail
- Telebasis sanguinalis Calvert, 1909
- Telebasis selaopyge De Marmels, 1989
- Telebasis simulacrum (Calvert, 1909)
- Telebasis simulata Tennessen, 2002
- Telebasis theodori (Navás, 1934)
- Telebasis versicolor Fraser, 1946 - Forcipate Firetail
- Telebasis vulnerata (Hagen, 1861)
- Telebasis watsoni Bick & Bick, 1995
- Telebasis williamsoni Garrison, 2009
- Telebasis willinki Fraser, 1948
