= Mallows Bay =

Bay in Maryland, US with many shipwrecks

- Mallows Bay-Widewater Historic and Archeological District
- U.S. National Register of Historic Places
- U.S. Historic district
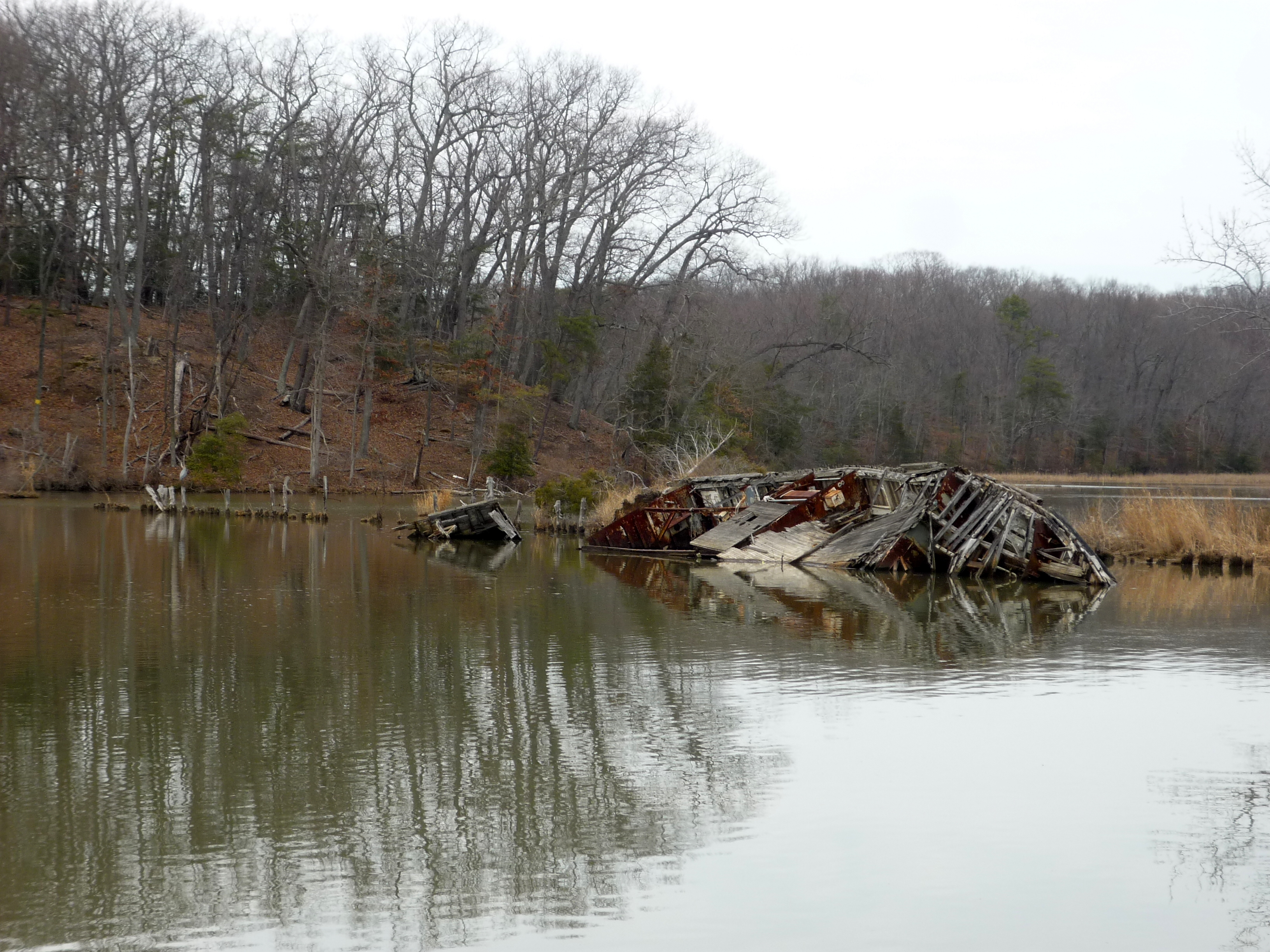
- A shipwreck at Mallows Bay, February 2011

- Location within Maryland Location within the United States
- Location: Off Sandy Point; Charles County, Maryland
- Coordinates: 38°28′21.4″N 77°16′6.9″W
- NRHP reference No.: 15000173
- Added to NRHP: April 24, 2015

Mallows Bay is a small bay in Maryland, on the left bank of the Potomac River, in Charles County, Maryland, United States. The bay is the location of what is regarded as the "largest shipwreck fleet in the Western Hemisphere" and is described as a "ship graveyard."

Mallows Bay is in the northeast corner of the Mallows Bay–Potomac River National Marine Sanctuary, which the National Oceanic and Atmospheric Administration designated on September 3, 2019. The bay lies in the northeast corner of the 18 square miles (47 km^{2}) of Potomac River waters included in the sanctuary.

== Ghost fleet ==
The "Ghost Fleet" of Mallows Bay is a reference to the hundreds of ships whose remains still rest in its relatively shallow waters. In total, 230 United States Shipping Board Merchant Fleet Corporation ships are sunken in the river. More than 100 of the vessels are wooden steamships, part of a fleet built to cross the Atlantic during World War I. Because they were built of wood due to a lack of available steel, most of these ships were obsolete upon completion after the end of the war.

The U.S. Navy did not want the ships, which were stored in the James River – at the cost of $50,000 a month – so they were sold to the Western Marine & Salvage Company. The company moved the ships to the Potomac River at Widewater, Virginia and in 1925, they were towed to Mallows Bay. Western Marine went bankrupt and the ships were burned and remained where they lay.

During World War II, Bethlehem Steel built a salvage basin to recover metal from the abandoned ships. Wrecks of various civilian boats are also present at the site.

Access to the ships is through Mallows Bay Park, operated by the county, located at 1440 Wilson Landing Road in Nanjemoy, Maryland. A 0.8-mile (1.3 km) trail loops around the park and the salvage basin. In 2010, a boat ramp and pier for recreational use was constructed to provide access to the Potomac River. It is popular to canoe or kayak among the ship ruins; the ships form a reef that hosts an array of wildlife.

The bay was listed as an archaeological and historic district on the National Register of Historic Places on April 24, 2015, and was included in the Mallows Bay–Potomac River National Marine Sanctuary on September 3, 2019.

Among the most prominent ships seen at Mallows Bay is the MV Accomac.

== Gallery ==
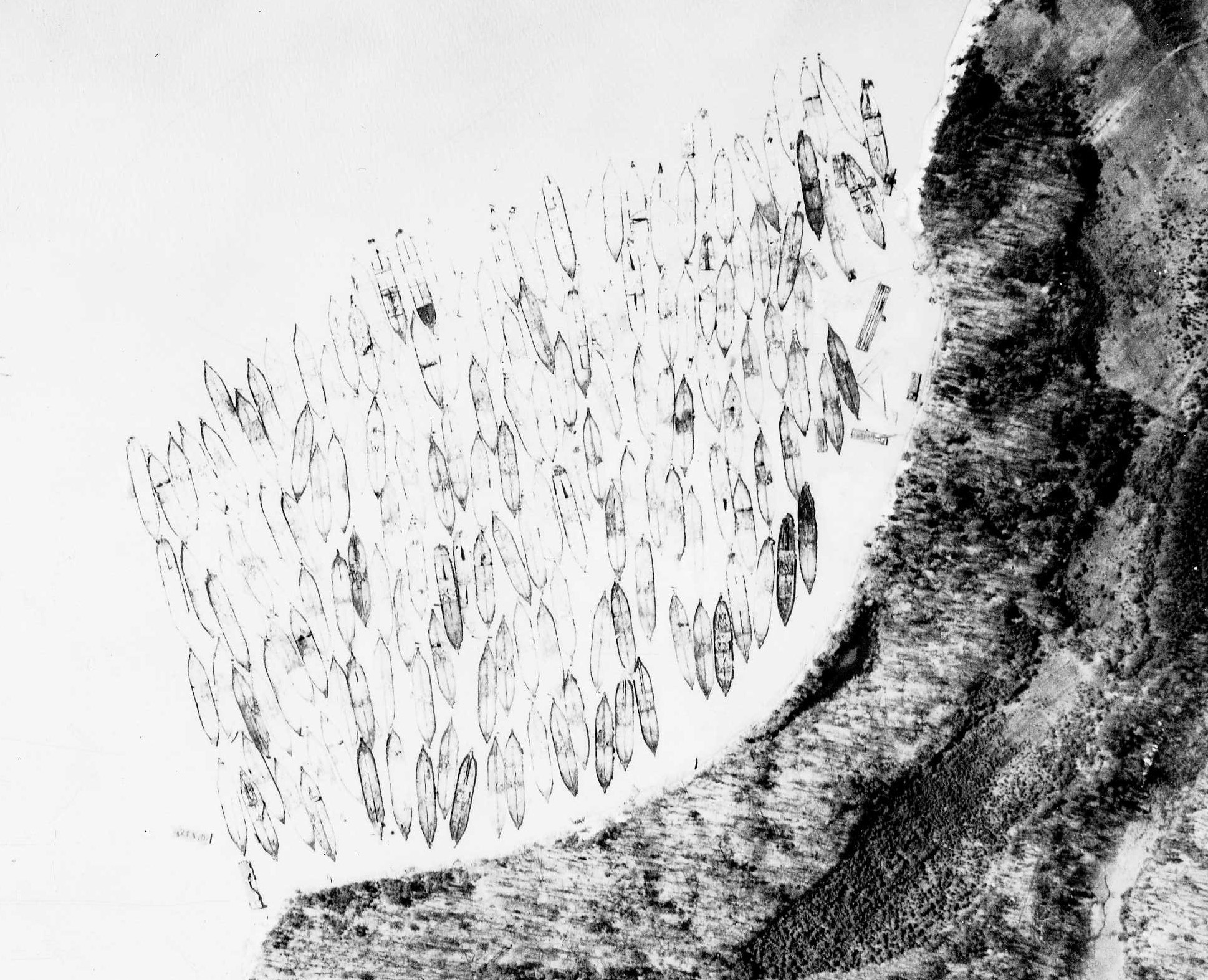
Aerial photograph 1936. Mallows Bay on Potomac River below Quantico and between Sandy Point and Liverpool Point. (Full image)

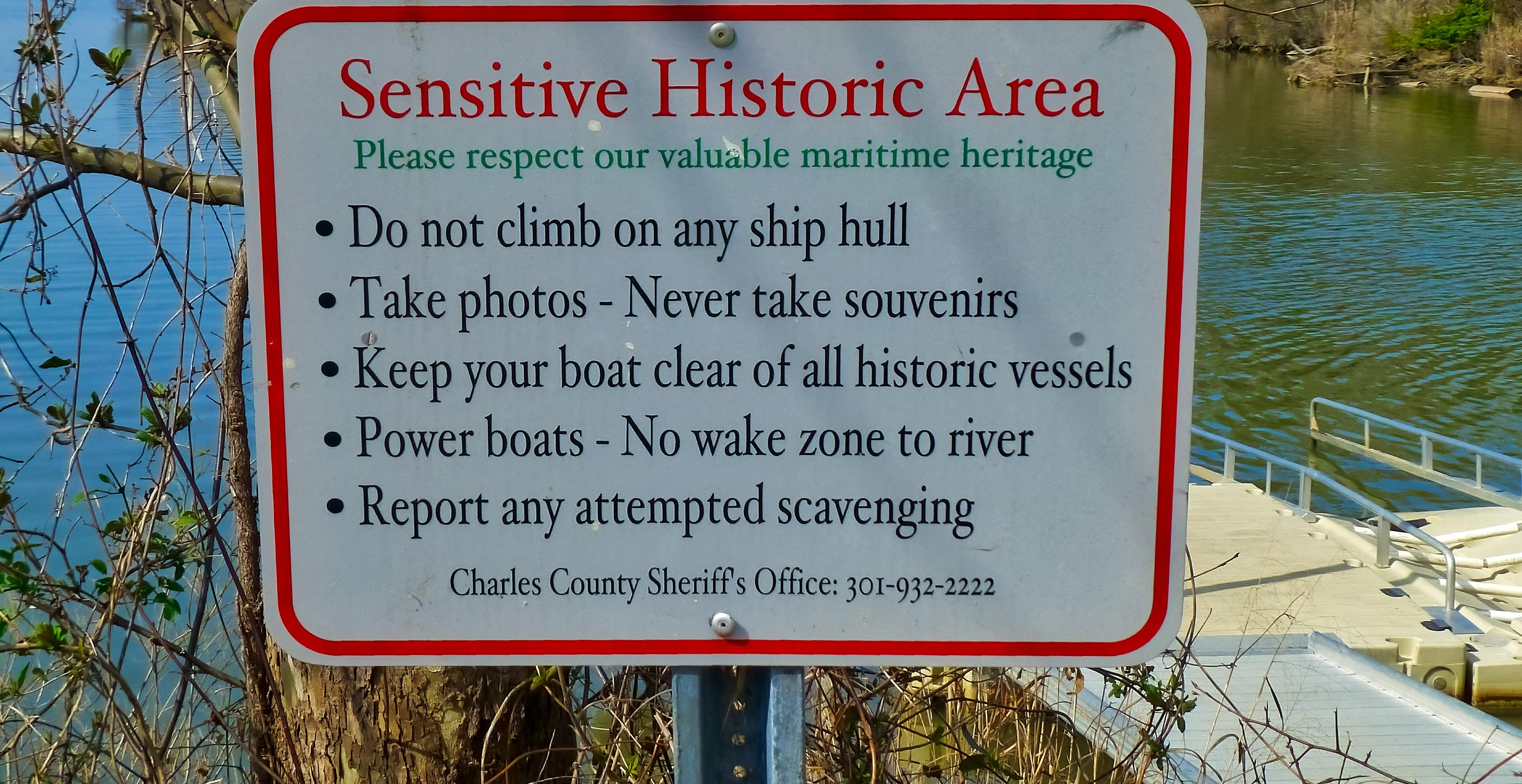
Valuable maritime heritage

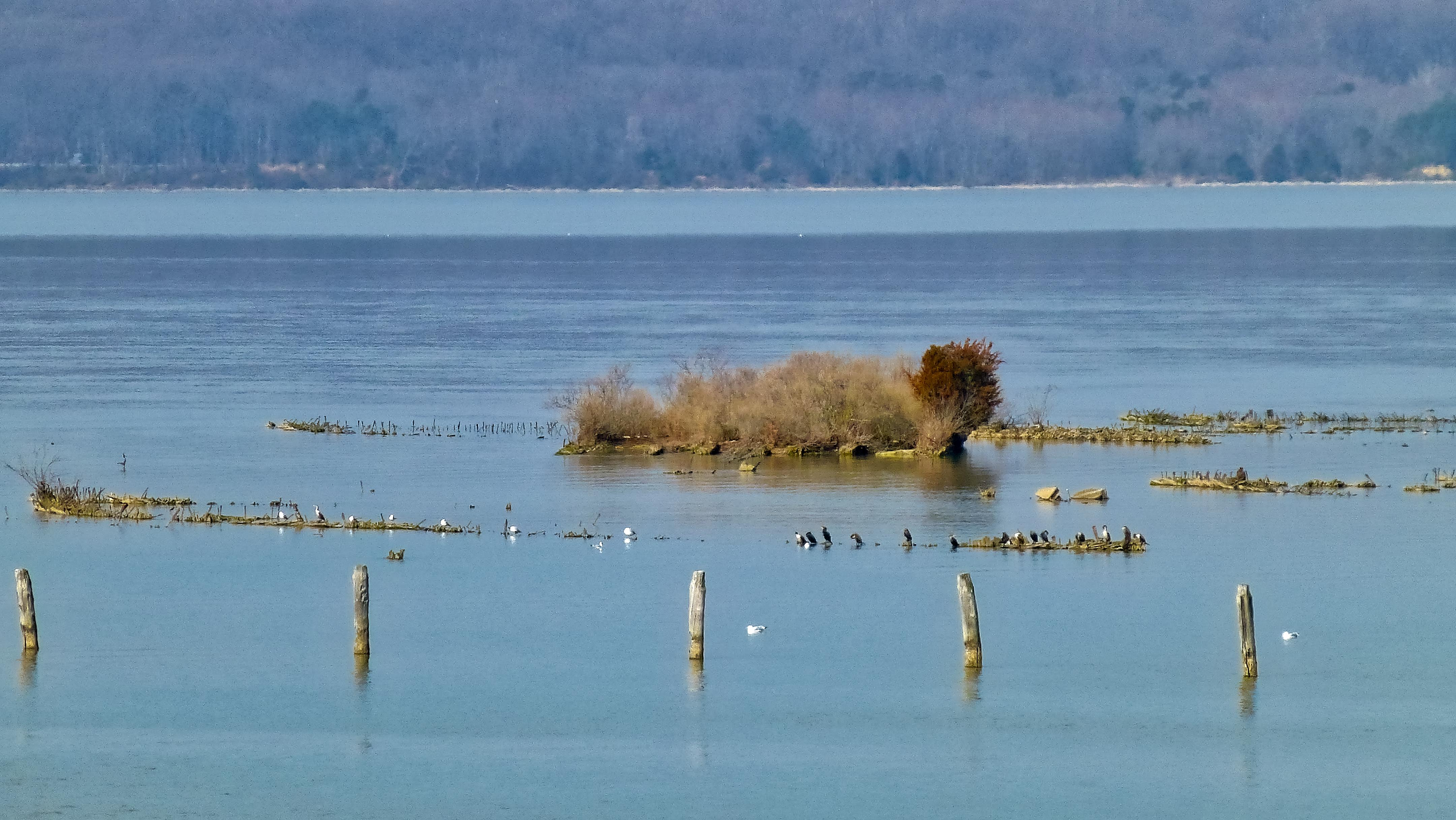
Almost submerged shipwrecks, February 2017

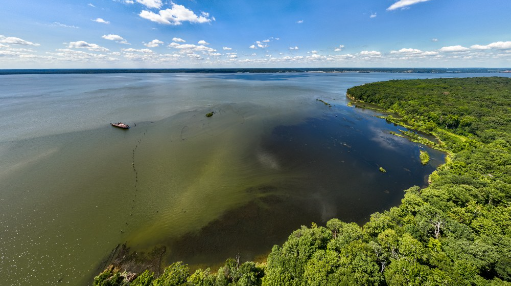
Aerial view of the shoreline of Mallows Bay looking toward the Potomac River

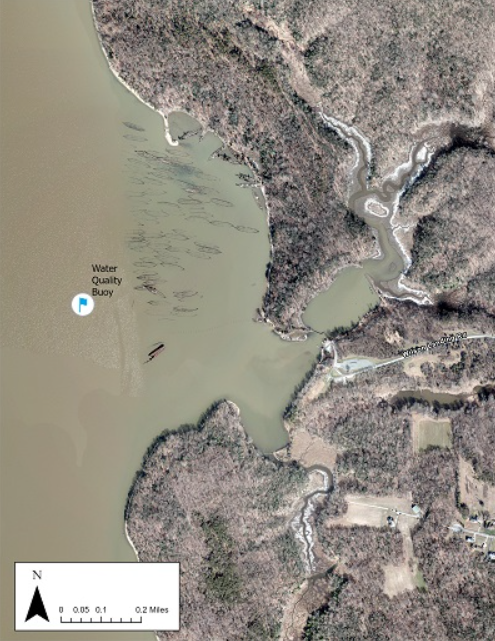
Overhead photo of Mallows Bay indicating the location of a buoy moored in 2018 that monitors water quality. Shipwrecks also are visible.

== See also ==
- National Register of Historic Places listings in Charles County, Maryland
