= MV Accomac =

American ferry built in 1928 and sunk in 1970

Coordinates: 38.47315°N 77.265938°W

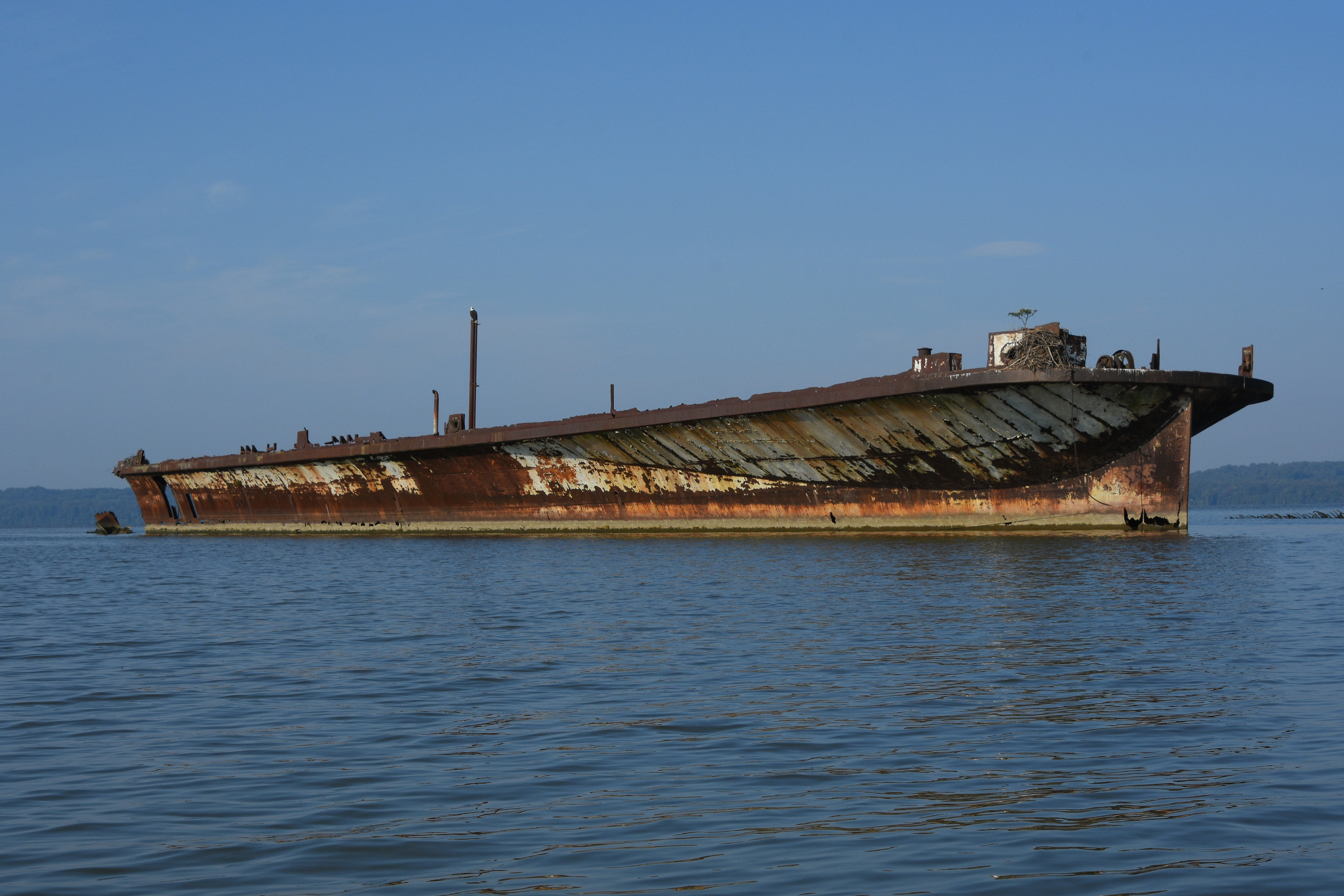
- The wreck of Accomac in Mallows Bay

History
- Name: Virginia Lee (1928-1949); Holiday (1949-1951); Accomac (1951-1973)
- Namesake: Virginia; Lee family
- Owner: Pennsylvania Railroad (1928-1949); Tolchester Lines (1949-1951); Virginia Ferry Corporation (1951-1964)
- Route: Norfolk to Cape Charles
- Builder: Bethlehem Shipbuilding Co
- Cost: $1 million ($10 million in 2024)
- Launched: July 24, 1928
- Maiden voyage: November 8, 1928
- Fate: Sunk in Mallows Bay

General characteristics
- Length: 300 ft (91 m)
- Beam: 50 ft (15 m)
- Depth: 17 ft (5.2 m)
- Capacity: 1,200 passengers

MV Accomac was an American passenger and vehicle ferry built in 1928 for Pennsylvania Railroad. Originally named the SS Virginia Lee, she was acquisitioned in 1942 for World War II, and then later returned as to work as a cruise ferry until 1964. Since 1970, she has been partially scrapped and beached in Mallows Bay.

== Dimensions and layout ==
The ship had three decks, the two upper decks were devoted to passenger transportation. The lower deck, in addition to accommodating the vehicles, also carried freight. On the upper deck there were two passenger saloons, while the hurricane or top deck provided staterooms for passengers, officers' quarters, and a sheltered space aft summer use.

The ship was propelled by two triple-expansion, four-cylinder engines, driving two screws and generating 2,400 indicated horsepower (1,800 kW), which sustained a speed of 18 mph (29 km/h).

In 1949, she was converted from a steamship to a diesel-powered vessel.

== History ==
=== Pennsylvania Railroad ===
The Virginia Lee was built by Bethlehem Steel in their Quincy, Massachusetts shipyard. She was launched from the Quincy shipyard on July 24, 1928, at 4:30 PM, witnessed by the mayors of Norfolk, and Cape Charles.

A naming contest was held for the new ferry, and the winner would get to name the ferry, $100, and the opportunity to christen it when it launched. Thousands of submissions were sent in, and the name Virginia Lee proposed by Mrs. J. J. Kindell of Norfolk, Virginia, was chosen.

The ships sea trial was performed in September 1928, when Virginia Lee sailed from the Fore River shipyard. The ship then was planned to leave Boston on October 16, and was scheduled to arrive in Norfolk on October 18, to be placed in immediate service. The ship did not depart Boston until October 23, and arrived in her new home port Cape Charles, October 25. Her maiden voyage was November 8, 1928.

=== World War II ===
On July 9, 1942, the ship was commandeered by the War Shipping Administration.

The plan was to send a small fleet of former bay boats up to St. John's, Newfoundland and Labrador to then be dispatched in convoy for the Atlantic crossing on September 21, 1942. The Virginia Lee developed structural troubles, and suffered a pipe freeze during her conversion, and the rest of the convoy sailed without her. Instead of Europe, the ship was sent to the Amazon River, where she carried cargoes in a rubber-development program sponsored by the U.S. Government.

=== Later career ===
At the end of World War II, the Virginia Lee was purchased by B. B. Wills, waterfront entrepreneur from Arlington, Virginia, who removed her steam engine and converted her to diesel. Renaming her MV Holiday, Wills planned to use her as an excursion and sightseeing boat in Florida waters. En route to Florida, she was caught in a storm storm and sustained extensive damaged. In 1951, Wills then sold her to the Virginia Ferry Corporation. She was taken to the Newport News Shipbuilding who converted her to an automobile ferry for use between Little Creek and Cape Charles.

With the completion of the Chesapeake Bay Bridge–Tunnel in April 1964, the Accomac along with three other Little Creek-Kiptopeke ferries were redundant and officially out of service. In January, Accomac was sold back to B. B. Wills for his Tolchester Lines, for $75,000, with the stipulation he would take possession of the ship in April. After her work as a ferry was completed, the work converting Accomac into an excursion ship began at a cost of $100,000-$300,000.

Catastrophically, on the night of May 27, while docked in Portsmouth, Virginia, a fire tore through the waterfront, destroying three piers, a warehouse, and several ships including Accomac. The following day, Assistant Fire Chief Clarence W. George said the fire, of undetermined origin, was first discovered aboard the Accomac shortly before midnight. The flames spread rapidly to the piers and other vessels and were not brought under control until 3:30 AM.

=== Failed scrapping ===
Plans to scrap Accomac were continually disrupted when the ship first ran aground near Dameron's Marsh on September 19, while being tugged to Baltimore. The ship then ran aground again at Fleeton, Virginia, and then in the Potomac River, where it was stuck for six weeks.

By December 1970, most of the Accomac was dismantled in Mallows Bay.
