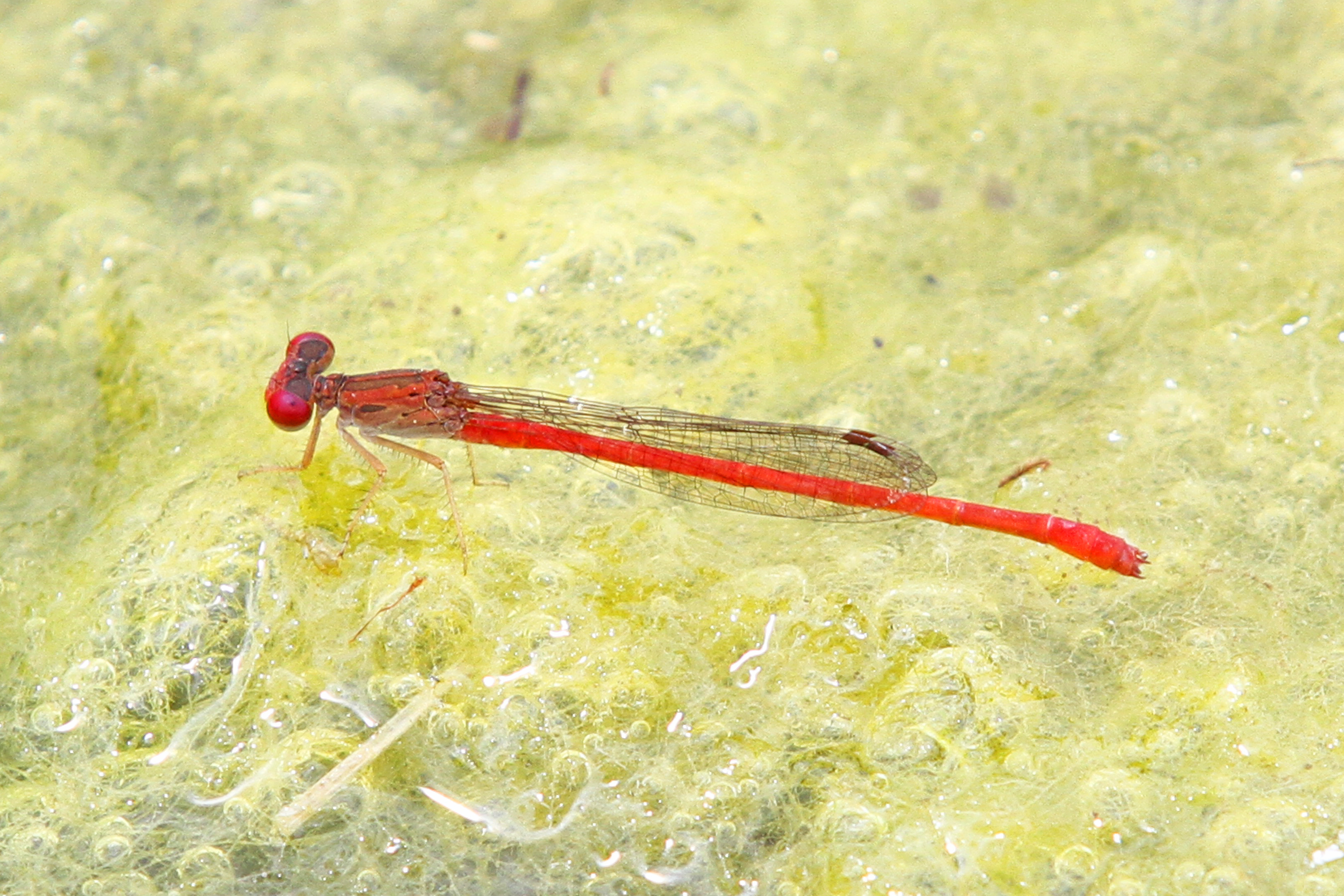

Conservation status
- Least Concern (IUCN 3.1)

Scientific classification
- Kingdom: Animalia
- Phylum: Arthropoda
- Class: Insecta
- Order: Odonata
- Suborder: Zygoptera
- Family: Coenagrionidae
- Genus: Telebasis
- Species: T. salva

Binomial name
- Telebasis salva (Hagen, 1861)

= Telebasis salva =

Species of damselfly

Telebasis salva, the desert firetail, is a species of narrow-winged damselfly in the family Coenagrionidae. It is found in Central America, North America, and South America.

The IUCN conservation status of Telebasis salva is "LC", least concern, with no immediate threat to the species' survival. The population is stable. The IUCN status was reviewed in 2018.

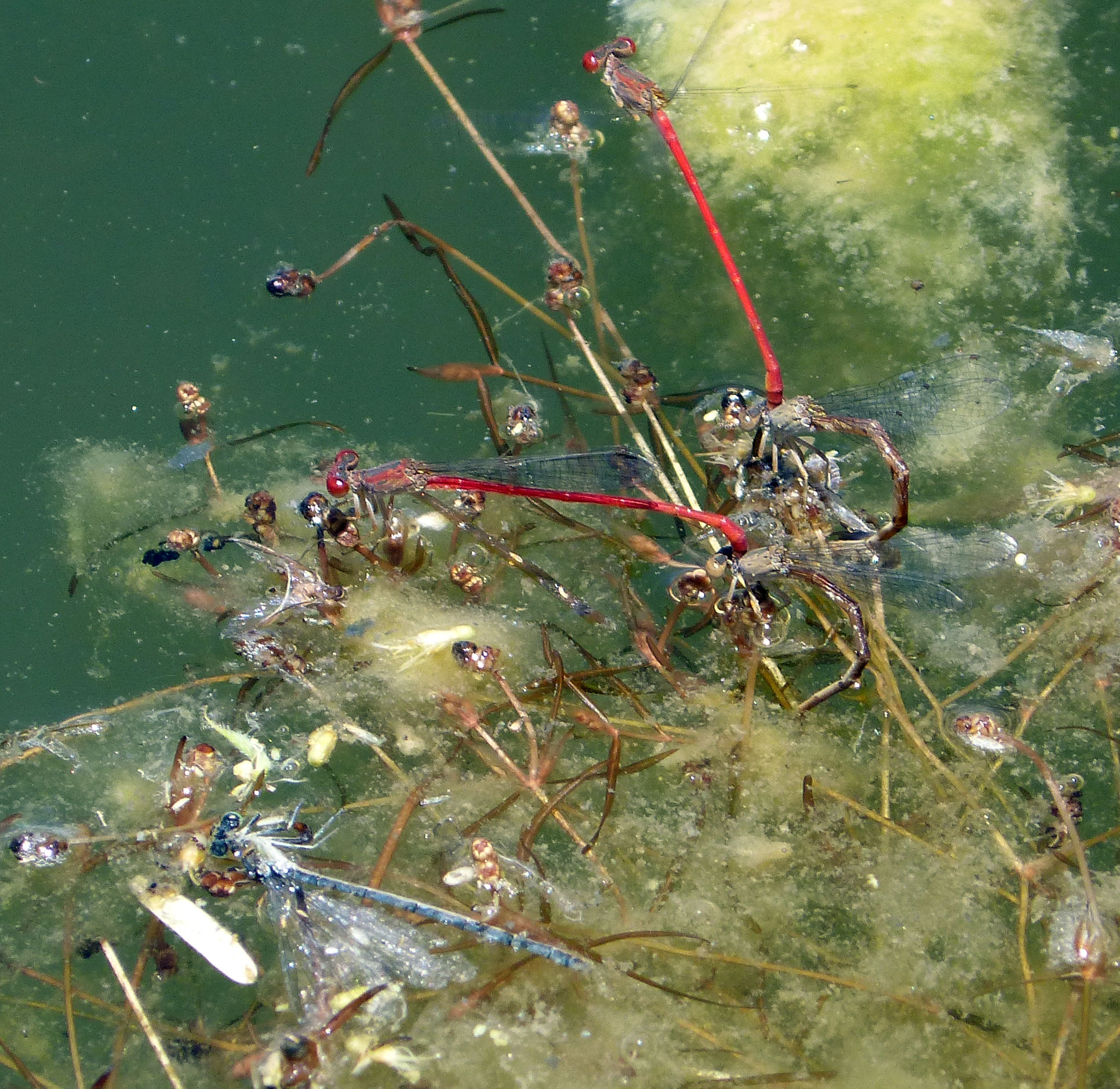
Desert firetail, Telebasis salva
