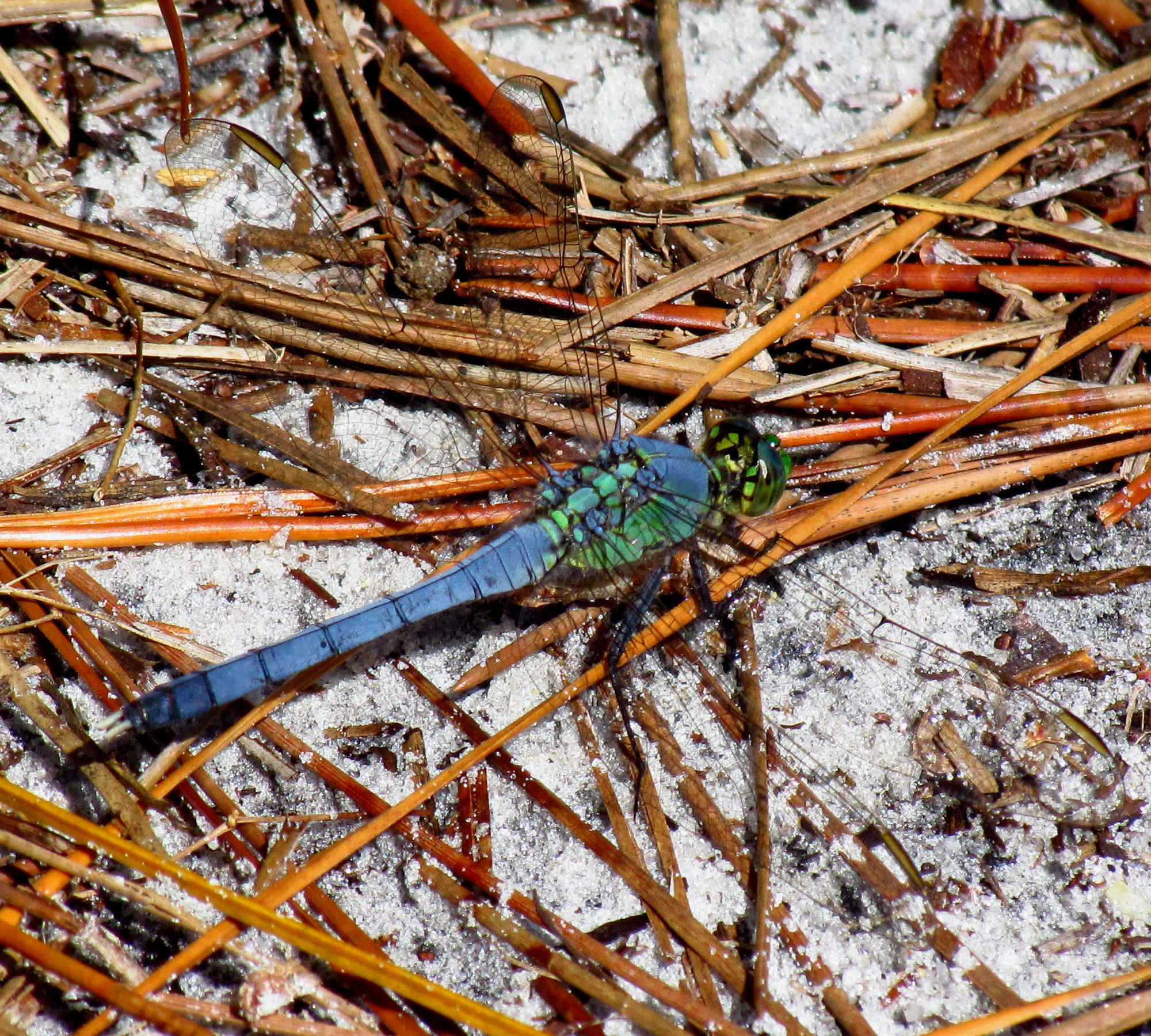
- Male
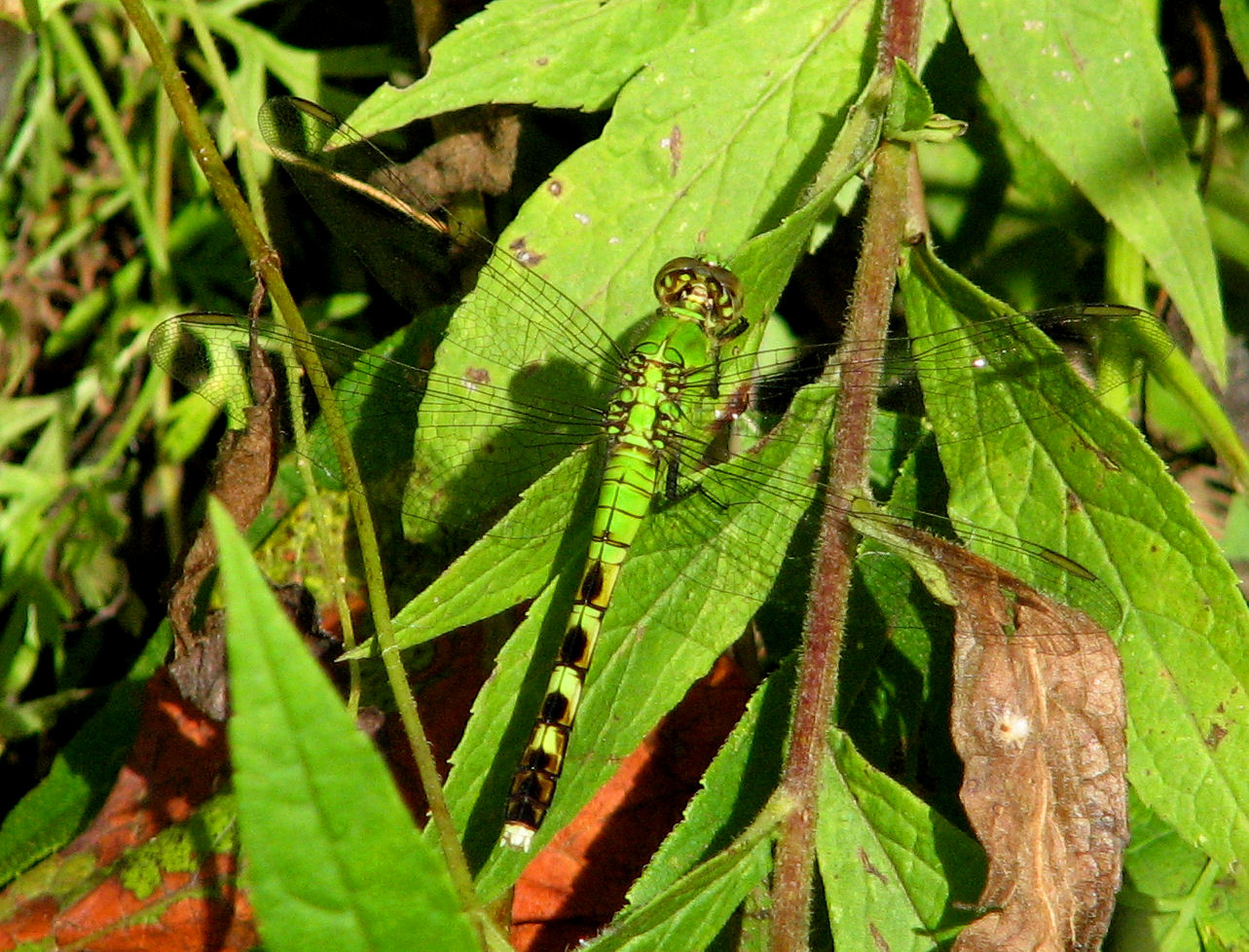
- Female

Conservation status
- Least Concern (IUCN 3.1)

Scientific classification
- Kingdom: Animalia
- Phylum: Arthropoda
- Clade: Pancrustacea
- Class: Insecta
- Order: Odonata
- Infraorder: Anisoptera
- Superfamily: Libelluloidea
- Family: Libellulidae
- Genus: Erythemis
- Species: E. simplicicollis

Binomial name
- Erythemis simplicicollis (Say, 1839)

= Erythemis simplicicollis =

Eastern pondhawk

Species of dragonfly

Erythemis simplicicollis, the eastern pondhawk, also known as the common pondhawk, is a dragonfly of the family Libellulidae, native to the eastern two-thirds of the United States and southern Ontario and Quebec, Canada. It is a dragonfly of ponds and still waters. The species is distinguished in that the female is bright green with a banded abdomen and the mature male has a blue abdomen with a green face and green and blue thorax.

== Description ==
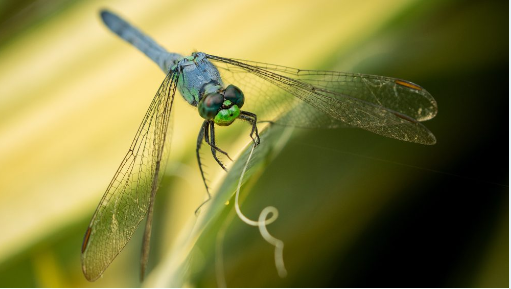
An eastern pondhawk in the Mallows Bay–Potomac River National Marine Sanctuary.

Nymphs of the eastern pondhawk are identifiable by their green eyes. When they leave the water and moult for the final time, the emerging immature adult is dull olive green but over the course of a few hours, the abdomen becomes bright green, there is dark brown banding and the heads take on a metallic green sheen. Over the course of their adult lives the green of the male is gradually transformed into a duller shade of blue and finally a powdery bluish-grey. The wings are distinctively veined and have dark margins near the apices. The length of this dragonfly is 36 to 48 mm (1.4 to 1.9 in).

== Distribution ==
The eastern pondhawk is native to parts of North America and Central America. Its range includes the provinces of Ontario and Quebec in Canada, much of the eastern United States, the Bahamas, the West Indies, Mexico and Central America as far south as Costa Rica. It is a widespread and abundant species and the International Union for Conservation of Nature has assessed its conservation status as being of "least concern".

== Ecology ==
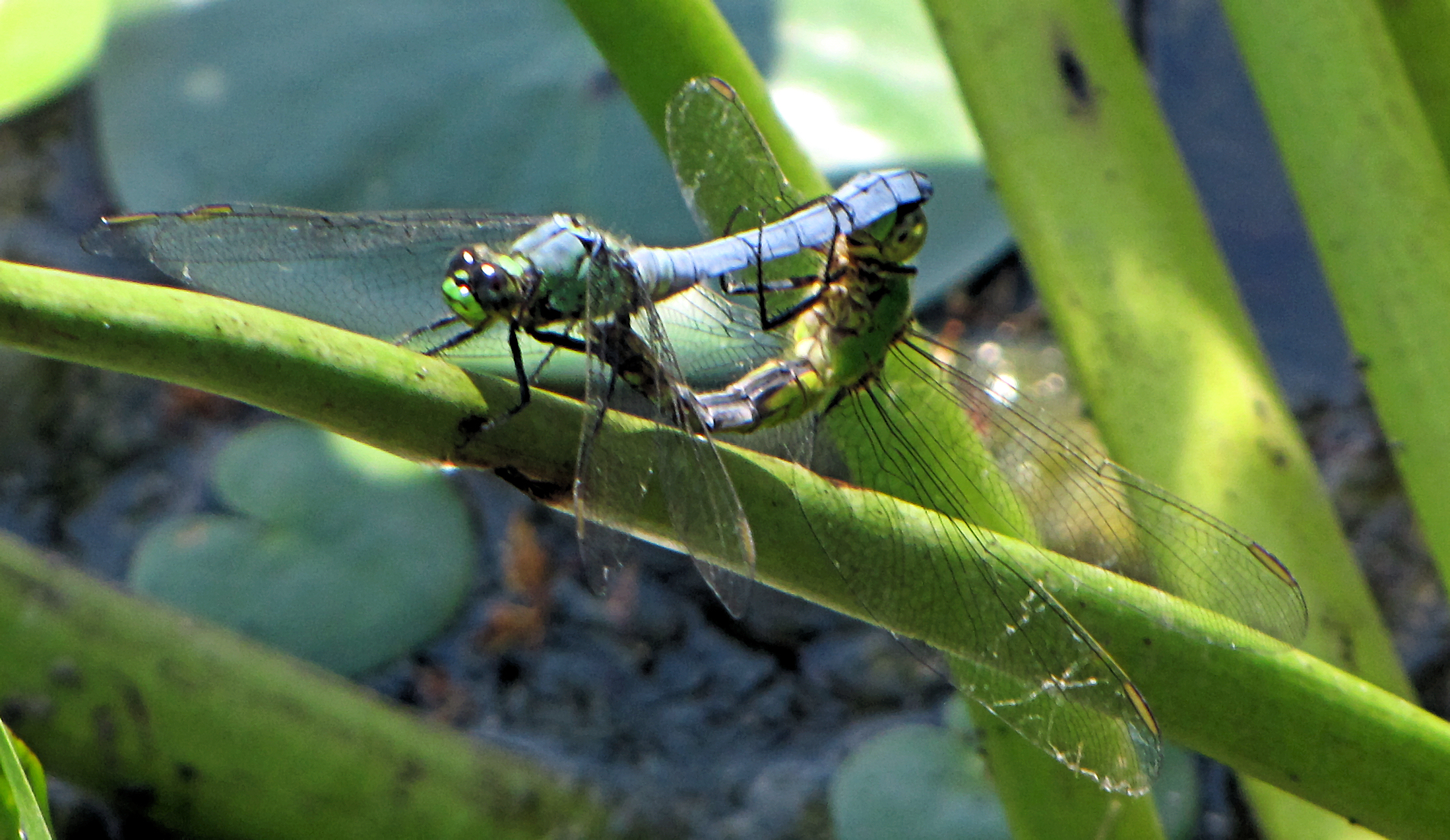
In 'wheel-position', Gatineau, Quebec

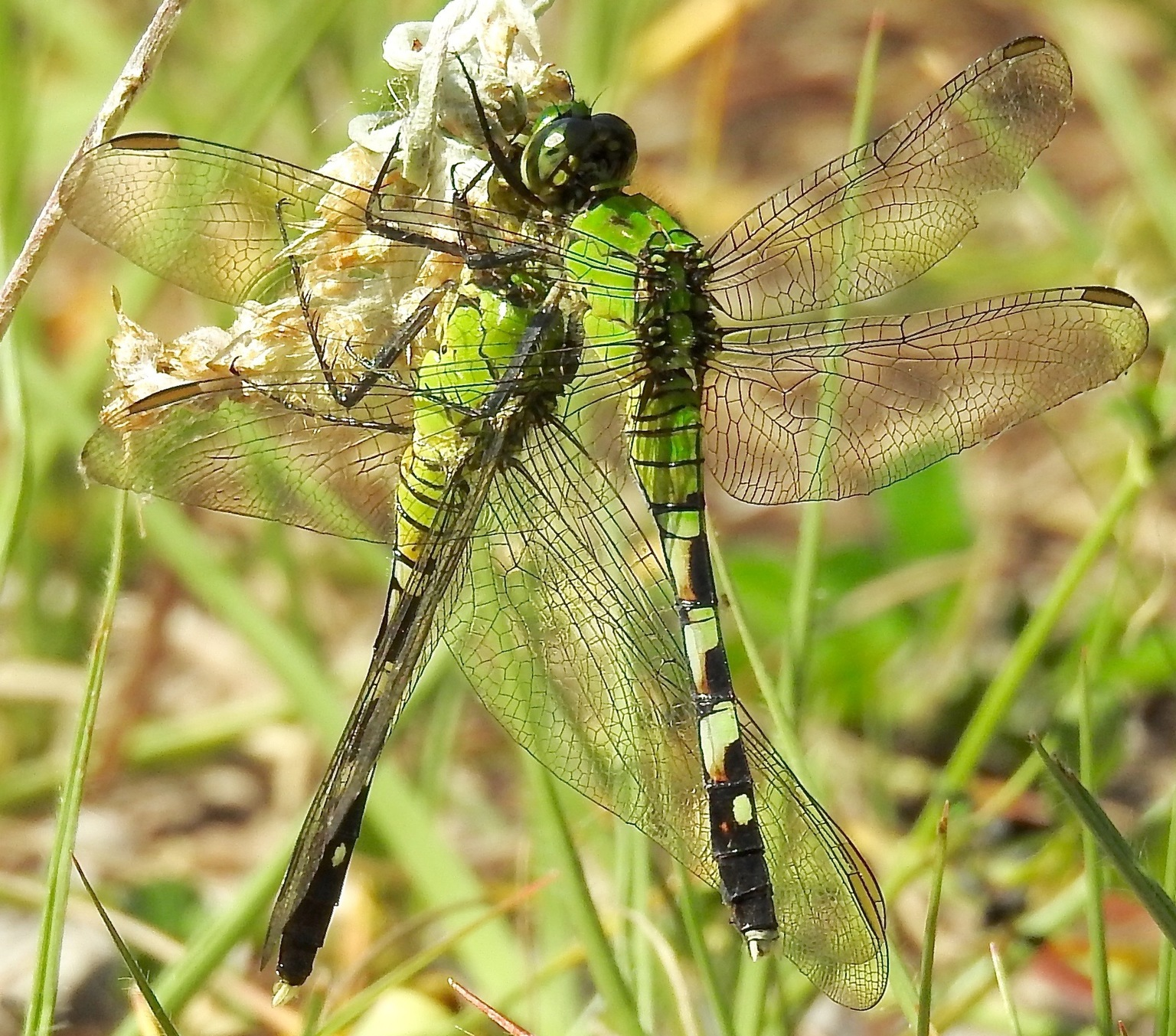
Female cannibalizing a young male

The eastern pondhawk is an athletic, swift-flying predator, able to catch damselflies and other insect prey on the wing. In between hunts it rests on vegetation, ready to take to the air if prey comes within sight. When newly emerged, the dragonflies at first hunt away from water. After about two weeks they return to the ponds and males set up territories, chasing away rivals. The males guard the floating algal mats that make suitable egg-laying sites. Satellite males remain nearby, awaiting an opportunity to intercept females or seize territories.

Mating takes place while the dragonflies are perched on vegetation close to the water. Within one minute of mating, the female starts to lay her eggs, the male hovering nearby to guard her. She flies low over the pond, dipping her abdomen into the water and depositing her eggs at intervals. Some females mate several times during a single day. In Florida, new batches of adults are emerging throughout the summer months; the reproductive adult has a lifespan of about ten days.
