= Society of the Faith of Jesus =

- Nickname: Fathers of the Faith, Paccanarists
- Formation: August 15, 1797
- Founder: Niccolò Paccanari
- Founded at: Rome, Papal States
- Dissolved: 1814

The Society of the Faith of Jesus (Latin: Societas de fide Iesu, Italian: Società della Fede di Gesù) was a short-lived religious congregation of the Catholic Church whose members were known as Fathers of the Faith (padri della Fede) or Paccanarists (paccanaristi), after the congregation's founder, Niccolò Paccanari.

== History ==
The congregation was founded by Niccolò Paccanari in Rome in 1797 in an attempt to keep alive the Society of Jesus after its suppression by the pope. Its first ten members professed their first vows at the Oratory of San Francesco Saverio del Caravita on August 15, 1797.

On April 12, 1798, Paccanari appeared before Pope Pius VI to obtain his approval for the congregation, which the pope gave. However, the pope instructed Paccanari that the Society of the Faith of Jesus merge with the other incipient, Jesuit offshoot, the Institute of Priests of the Heart of Jesus. Paccanari agreed to this and the two congregations merged on April 18, 1799, with Paccanari being elected as the new group's superior. Its members established ministries in Italy, France, and Germany, Austria, Switzerland, the Netherlands, and England.

The congregation disbanded after Pope Pius VII lifted the order suppressing the Jesuits in 1814, restoring the Society of Jesus.

== Notable members ==
- Anthony Kohlmann, later became a Jesuit educator
- Niccolò Paccanari, founder
