= Niccolò Paccanari =

Italian Catholic priest

The Reverend Niccolò Paccanari
- Born: 1773; Borgo Valsugana, Trentino, Holy Roman Empire
- Died: c. 1811 (aged 37–38); Rome, Papal States
- Known for: Founding the Society of the Faith of Jesus

Orders
- Ordination: 1800

Niccolò Paccanari (1773 – c. 1811) was an Italian Catholic priest and the founder of the Society of the Faith of Jesus.

== Early life ==
Paccanari was born in 1773 in Borgo Valsugana, Trentino. In his youth, he had little formal education; he became a soldier and was engaged in business.

== Religious life ==
In 1795, he became gravely ill and spent 14 months in prayer and recuperation with a confraternity at the Oratory of San Francesco Saverio del Caravita in Rome. At the end of this period, Paccanari established a religious congregation called the Society of the Faith of Jesus on 15 August 1797, whose purpose was to continue as the successor of the Society of Jesus, which had been suppressed by the pope. His four confrères elected him as the first superior of the new congregation. In 1798, Paccanari founded a novitiate for the congregation in Spoleto, Umbria.

Paccanari was jailed three times in Castel Sant'Angelo during the short-lived Roman Republic. In 1800, he was ordained a priest. As the congregation grew to more than 100 individuals across Europe, the members became dissatisfied with Paccanari, who they accused of being ambitious and materialistic.

== Prison life ==
As internal strife grew, Paccanari was investigated by the Roman Inquisition, which found him guilty and sentenced him to 10 years in prison in August 1808. However, Paccanari was released from prison in 1809 by the French occupiers of Rome. The following year, he again spent time in prison for another offense.

== Death ==
It is not certain when or how Paccanari died. In 1811, a decapitated body was found in the Tiber River in Rome, which was identified as his.
