= Adam Marshall (disambiguation) =

Adam Marshall (born 1984) is an Australian politician for the National Party of Australia.

Adam Marshall may also refer to:

- Adam Marshall (priest) (1785–1825), American Jesuit priest

== See also ==
- Adam Marshall Diston (1893–1956), Scottish journalist
- Marshall (name)
