= Enoch Fenwick =

American Jesuit priest (1780–1827)

The Reverend Enoch Fenwick SJ

12th President of Georgetown College
- In office 1820–1825
- Preceded by: Anthony Kohlmann
- Succeeded by: Benedict Joseph Fenwick

Personal details
- Born: May 15, 1780 St. Mary's County, Maryland, U.S.
- Died: November 25, 1827 (aged 47) Georgetown, D.C., (Note: Georgetown was a separately chartered city within the District of Columbia until the consolidation of the district's governments into a single entity, Washington, D.C., with the Organic Act of 1871.) U.S.
- Resting place: Jesuit Community Cemetery
- Relations: Benedict Fenwick (brother)
- Education: Georgetown College; St. Mary's Seminary

Orders
- Ordination: March 12, 1808 by Leonard Neale

Enoch Fenwick SJ (May 15, 1780 – November 25, 1827) was an American Catholic priest and Jesuit who ministered throughout Maryland and became the twelfth president of Georgetown College. Descending from one of the original Catholic settlers of the Province of Maryland, he studied at Georgetown College in what is now Washington, D.C. Like his brother and future bishop, Benedict Joseph Fenwick, he entered the priesthood, studying at St. Mary's Seminary before entering the Society of Jesus, which was suppressed at the time. He was made rector of St. Peter's Pro-Cathedral in Baltimore by Archbishop John Carroll, and remained in the position for ten years. Near the end of his pastorate, he was also made vicar general of the Archdiocese of Baltimore, which involved traveling to say Mass in remote parishes throughout rural Maryland.

In 1820, Fenwick reluctantly accepted his appointment as president of Georgetown College. While he made some improvements to the curriculum, contemporaries generally considered his presidency unsuccessful due to declining enrollment and mounting debt. In August 1825, he abandoned the presidency following a disagreement with the provincial superior. Two years later, he died at Georgetown.

== Early life ==
Enoch Fenwick was born on May 15, 1780, in St. Mary's County, Maryland. He was one of four brothers, three of whom would become priests. He descended from one of the original Catholic settlers of the Maryland Province, Cuthbert Fenwick. One of his brothers was Benedict Joseph Fenwick, who became the Bishop of Boston and a president of Georgetown College. Another brother, George Fenwick, also entered the priesthood, while another brother did not enter religious life.

Fenwick enrolled at Georgetown College in 1793, which he attended until 1797. The president, Louis William Valentine DuBourg, identified him as the best student in the college, and appointed him in 1797 to teach rudiments to the young students in the lower school. He then entered St. Mary's Seminary in Baltimore in 1805. The following year, he entered the Society of Jesus on October 10, becoming a member of the first class in the Jesuit novitiate at Georgetown, and one of four (Note: The other three ordained alongside Fenwick were Benedict Fenwick, Leonard Edelen, and James Spink.) who were the first Jesuits ordained priests in the United States.

As the Jesuit order had been officially suppressed by Pope Clement XIV, Fenwick was admitted to the Corporation of Catholic Clergymen, the civil corporation that sought to preserve the Society and its property until its restoration by Pope Pius VII in 1815. He was ordained a priest on March 12, 1808, in Georgetown, by Bishop Leonard Neale.

== Ministry in Baltimore ==
Following his ordination, he was made the assistant to the Archbishop of Baltimore, John Carroll. Upon the death of Francis Beeston in 1809, Fenwick was appointed by Carroll as rector of St. Peter's Pro-Cathedral in Baltimore, where he raised money for the construction of a new St. Peter's church building. He oversaw work that began in 1806 and continued until 1812, before being halted by the War of 1812. Construction resumed in 1815, and was completed in 1821. Fenwick held the position of rector until 1820, when he was succeeded by James Whitfield. From 1809 to 1815, he also served on the board of directors of Georgetown College.

Simultaneous with his rectorship, he became vicar general for the Archdiocese of Baltimore in 1819. In this position he served as chaplain in Port Tobacco, Maryland, where he said Mass every other Sunday. He was also required to travel to three other parishes throughout Charles County (in Lower Zacchia, Upper Zacchia, and Pomfret) every other Sunday, because they had been abandoned by a priest who returned to England.

He was considered on several occasions for being raised to the episcopate, specifically as Bishop of Louisiana and the Two Floridas or Bishop of Detroit. He was also considered by Bishop Edward Fenwick for being made the coadjutor bishop of the Diocese of Cincinnati.

== Georgetown College ==
The Jesuit visitor to the United States, Peter Kenney, recommended to Archbishop Ambrose Maréchal of Baltimore that Fenwick be appointed president of Georgetown College in the summer of 1820. This recommendation heeded, he was informed that he would be named to the office in August of that year, and his term officially began on September 16, 1820. He assumed the office very reluctantly from Anthony Kohlmann, who quit the presidency to establish the Washington Seminary. Resenting his transfer from the cathedral in Baltimore to Georgetown, Fenwick viewed the college as having "one foot in the grave of disgrace" and little prospect for recovery.

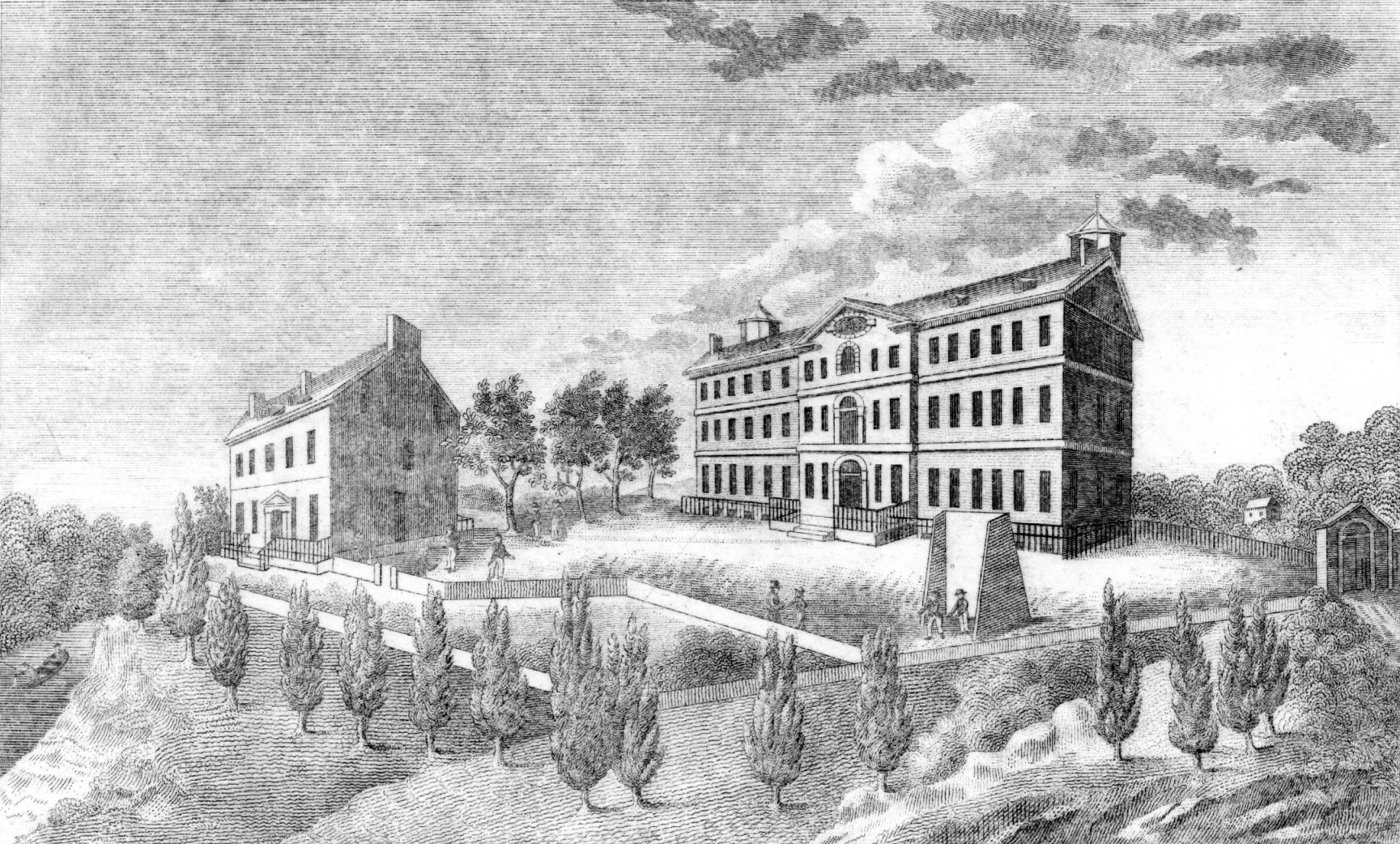
The campus of Georgetown College shortly after the end of Enoch Fenwick's presidency

Fenwick undertook several reforms of the curriculum. He divided the year into two semesters, and definitively prescribed the course of study as including one class of rudiments, three in grammar, one in humanities, and one in rhetoric. Each professor also taught Ancient Greek, French, Latin, and English in their classes. The first college journal, called The Minerva, was also circulated. Printing presses were not available to the school, so it was written in manuscript form, and lasted for only a few issues. The college's library saw substantial growth during his tenure, and he personally donated a number of books.

Despite these reforms, Fenwick's administration of the college was evaluated by Stephen Larigaurdelle Dubuisson, a subsequent president of Georgetown, as "wretched". The size of the student body declined, due to the opening of Columbian College and the Washington Seminary nearby, and the college's debts grew, as he viewed pursuing parents for overdue tuition and board distasteful during the economic recession. The reputation of the school suffered due to this. Fenwick attempted to offset this decline by publishing a new prospectus and placing advertisements in newspapers. His administration was markedly hands-off, as he allowed the prefect of studies, Roger Baxter, to manage most of the affairs of the school. Baxter was known for his liberal attitude toward student discipline and in his own consumption of alcohol and alleged unaccompanied visitation of women in the City of Washington; Baxter was later deported to Europe by the provincial superior, Francis Dzierozynski.

On March 10, 1824, Ann Carbery Mattingly, the sister of Mayor Thomas Carbery of Washington, D.C., was apparently cured of terminal breast cancer after being delivered a Eucharist by Dubuisson, then a priest at St. Patrick's Church, in conjunction with the prayers of Prince Alexander of Hohenlohe-Waldenburg-Schillingsfürst in Germany. News of the event spread quickly throughout the city and the cure was promoted as a miracle by Dubuisson and Kohlmann. Meanwhile, an anonymous letter was published in the National Intelligencer in April denouncing the legitimacy of the miracle and sharply criticizing Kohlmann. It was immediately suspected that the author of the letter was Thomas Levins, an Irish Jesuit professor at Georgetown. Dzierozynski demanded an explanation from Levins and Levins's superior, Fenwick, but both refused to answer. In October 1824, a series of even harsher letters was published, and Levins was expelled from the Society of Jesus by the Jesuit Superior General, Luigi Fortis, in January 1825.

After being confronted by Dzierozynski, Fenwick left the college in August 1825 for St. Thomas Manor in Maryland and – although he had not officially resigned the presidency – refused to return to Georgetown. This effectively left Dzierozynski, who spoke little English and was unfamiliar with American ways, in charge of the school. Fenwick was officially replaced by his brother, Benedict, on September 15, 1825, who resumed the office in an acting capacity. Fenwick died on November 25, 1827, at Georgetown College, and was buried in the Jesuit Community Cemetery.

== Notes ==
Catholic Church titles
Preceded by Francis Beeston	3rd Rector of St. Peter's Pro-Cathedral; 1809–1820	Succeeded by James Whitfield
Preceded by –	Vicar General of the Archdiocese of Baltimore; 1819–1820	Succeeded by –
Academic offices
Preceded by Anthony Kohlmann	12th President of Georgetown College; 1820–1825	Succeeded by Benedict Joseph Fenwick as Acting President
