= Benedict Joseph Fenwick =

American Catholic bishop (1782–1846)

The Right Reverend Benedict Joseph Fenwick SJ
- Bishop of Boston
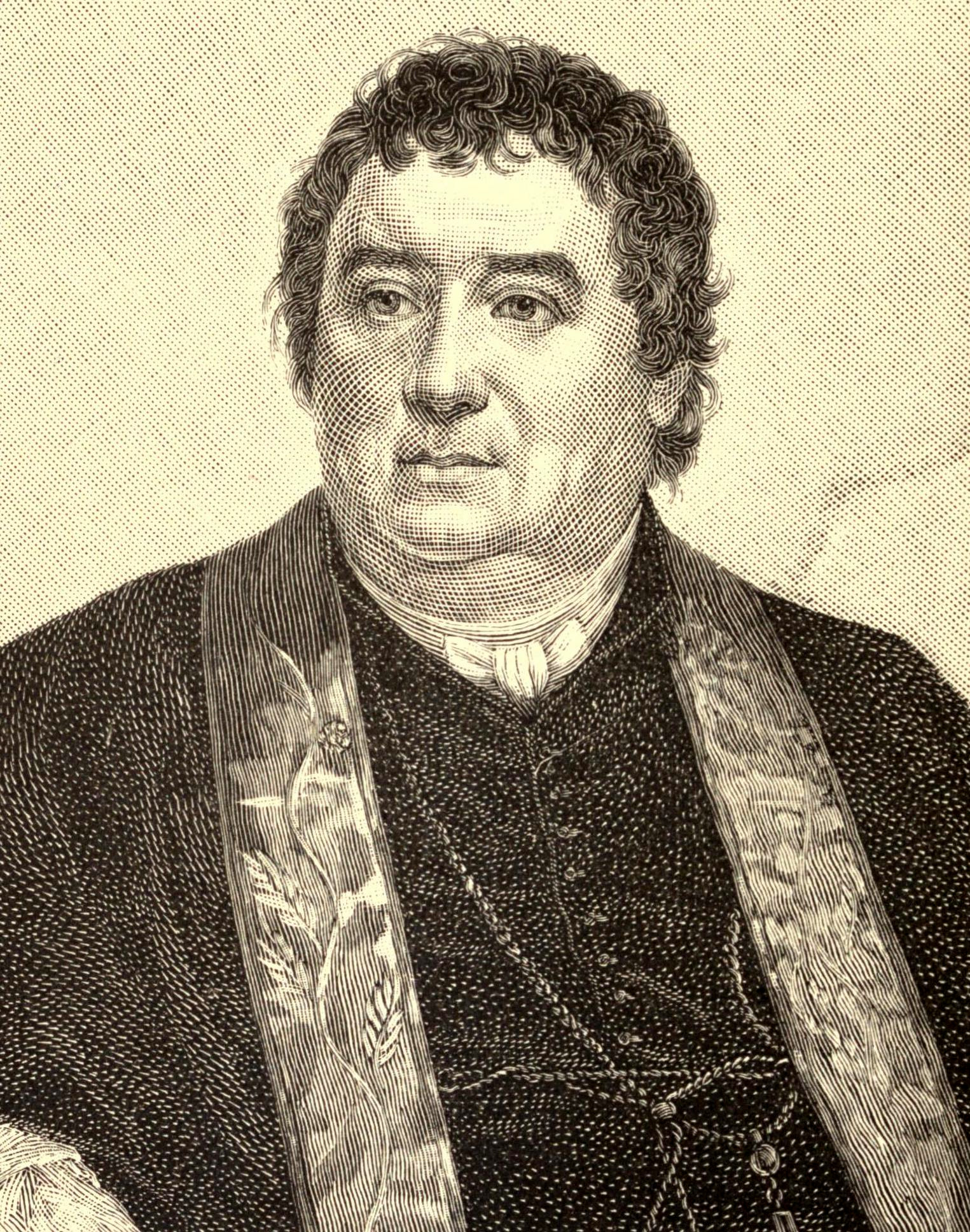
- See: Boston
- Appointed: May 10, 1825
- Installed: December 21, 1825
- Term ended: August 11, 1846
- Predecessor: Jean-Louis Lefebvre de Cheverus
- Successor: John Bernard Fitzpatrick

Orders
- Ordination: March 12, 1808 by Leonard Neale
- Consecration: November 1, 1825 by Ambrose Maréchal

Personal details
- Born: September 3, 1782 Leonardtown, Maryland, U.S.
- Died: August 11, 1846 (aged 63) Boston, Massachusetts, U.S.
- Buried: College of the Holy Cross Cemetery
- Denomination: Catholic Church
- Education: Georgetown College; St. Mary's Seminary
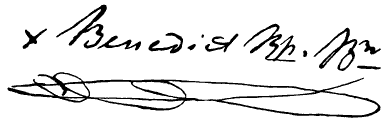
- Signature

Benedict Joseph Fenwick SJ (September 3, 1782 – August 11, 1846) was an American Catholic prelate, Jesuit, and educator who served as the bishop of Boston from 1825 until his death in 1846. In 1843, he founded the College of the Holy Cross in Worcester, Massachusetts. Prior to that, he was twice the president of Georgetown College in Washington D.C. and established several educational institutions in New York City and Boston.

Born in Maryland, Fenwick entered the Society of Jesus and began his ministry in New York City in 1809 as the co-pastor of St. Peter's Church. He then became pastor of the original St. Patrick's Cathedral and later the vicar general and diocesan administrator of the Diocese of New York. In 1817, Fenwick became the president of Georgetown College, remaining just several months before he was tasked with resolving a longstanding schism at St. Mary's Church in Charleston, South Carolina. He remained in the city as vicar general for the Archdiocese of Baltimore until 1822, when he returned to Georgetown as acting president.

Fenwick became the bishop of Boston in 1825, during a period of rapid growth of the city's Catholic population due to massive Irish immigration. At the same time, Catholics faced intense nativism and anti-Catholicism, culminating in the burning of the Ursuline Convent in 1834, threats against Fenwick's life, and the formation of the Montgomery Guards. Fenwick also addressed parochial conflict, ultimately placing a Boston church under interdict. He established churches, schools, charitable institutions, and newspapers throughout the diocese, which encompassed all of New England. Among these were The Pilot newspaper and the College of the Holy Cross.

== Early life ==
Benedict Joseph Fenwick was born on September 3, 1782, at Beaverdam Manor in Leonardtown, Maryland, to George Fenwick II, a planter and surveyor, and Margaret Fenwick, née Medley. His paternal ancestors immigrated to the American colonies from Northumberland in North East England. Benedict's great-great-great-grandfather, Cuthbert Fenwick, emigrated to America in the 1633 expedition of the Ark and the Dove, and was one of the original Catholic settlers of the British Province of Maryland. Benedict's elder brother was Enoch Fenwick, who would also become a prominent Jesuit, and his cousin was Edward Fenwick, who would become a Dominican and bishop of Cincinnati.

When Fenwick's family moved from Leonardtown to Georgetown, Fenwick was enrolled at Georgetown College in 1793. Intending to enter the priesthood, he began his study of theology in 1801, and proved to be a good student, earning highest academic honors. After completing his studies at Georgetown, the college named him as a professor

In 1805, Fenwick left Georgetown to enter St. Mary's Seminary in Baltimore. However, after the restoration of the Society of Jesus by the Vatican, he left St. Mary's in 1806. He and his brother were among the first six seminarians to enter the newly restored Jesuit novitiate in Baltimore on October 10, 1806.

== Ministry in New York ==
On March 12, 1808, Fenwick was ordained a priest at Georgetown College by Leonard Neale, the coadjutor bishop of the Archdiocese of Baltimore.

In November 1808, after the Vatican erected the Diocese of New York, Fenwick was sent with Reverend Anthony Kohlmann to minister to the Catholics of New York City. They were placed in charge of St. Peter's Parish, the only Catholic parish in the city. Fenwick assisted in establishing the New York Literary Institution, the second Jesuit school in New York City. As an offshoot of Georgetown College, the institution was staffed by four Jesuit scholastics from Georgetown, with Fenwick as president. The school was opened in 1808, in a house on Mulberry Street, across the street from the future site of the original St. Patrick's Cathedral. It remained there only briefly, before relocating to Broadway in September 1809; it moved again in March 1810 to a plot of land "far out in the country," north of the New York City limits. This new site would eventually become the location of the new St. Patrick's Cathedral, in Midtown Manhattan.

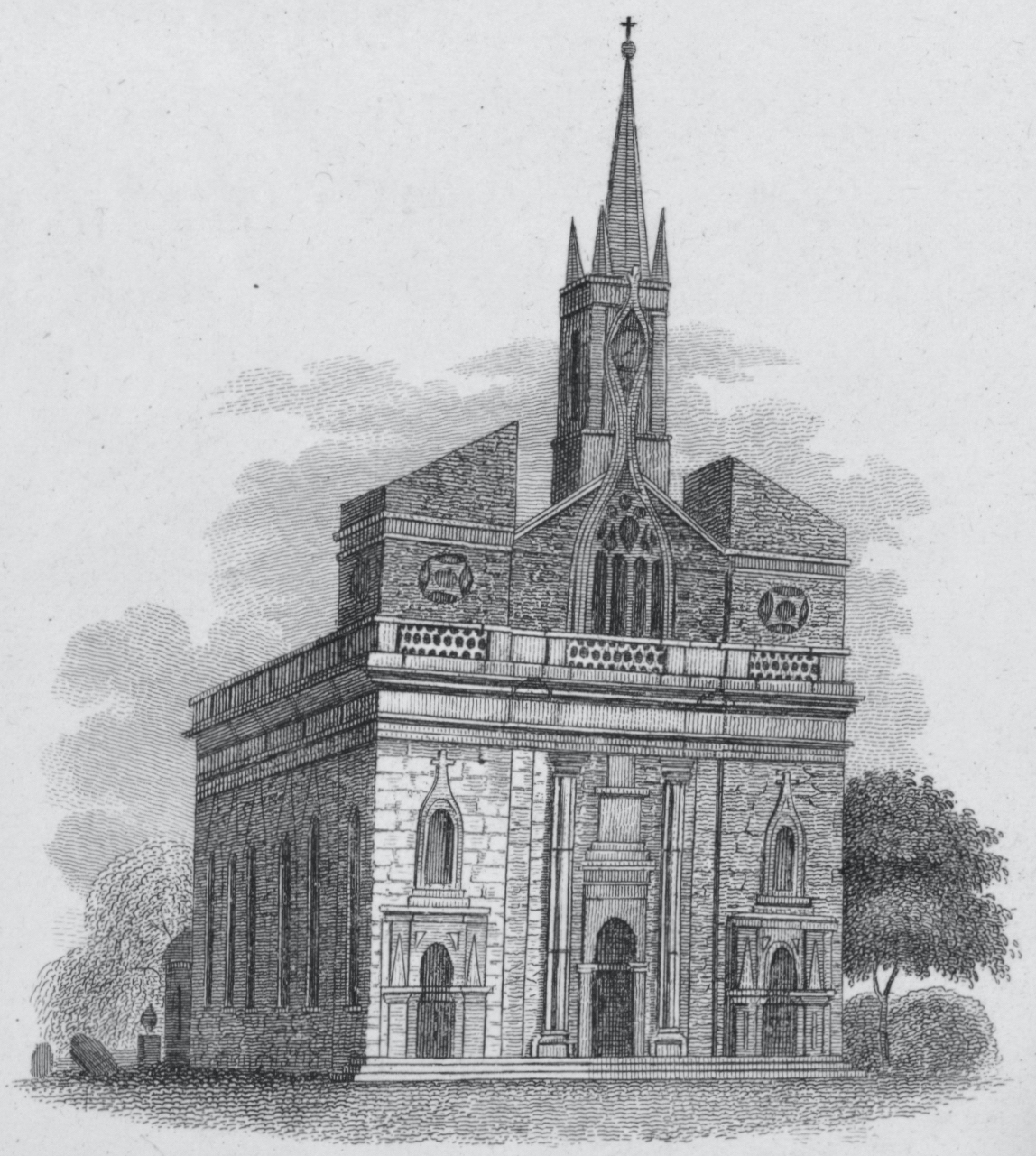
The original St. Patrick's Cathedral, as it appeared during Fenwick's time there

The New York Literary Institution grew quickly, enrolling the sons of several prominent Catholic and Protestant families. Its curriculum emphasized the study of Latin, Ancient Greek, and French. However, the Jesuit superior in the United States, Giovanni Antonio Grassi, determined that there were not enough Jesuits in the United States to sustain both Georgetown and the New York Literary Institution. Despite Kohlmann desiring to close Georgetown, Grassi sided with the bulk of Jesuits who were native to Maryland and ordered the closure of the New York Literary Institution in 1813, with it officially disbanding in April 1814. Responsibility for the facility was transferred to the Trappist order.

While in New York, Fenwick and Kohlmann were called for by the dying Thomas Paine, to his house in Greenwich Village. Having been unsuccessfully treated by several physicians, Paine sought priests to heal him. Fenwick and Kohlmann attempted to convince him to renounce a lifetime of writings denouncing Christianity; in response, Paine angrily threw them out of his house.

Fenwick served alongside Kohlmann as pastor of Old St. Patrick's Cathedral from 1809 to 1815. When Kohlmann was recalled to Maryland in 1815, Fenwick replaced him as pastor of St. Peter's Parish and as the diocesan administrator of the Diocese of New York. Fenwick was successful in prompting hundreds of conversions to Catholicism throughout the diocese during his tenure. He was present at the formal dedication of Old St. Patrick's Cathedral in 1816. He also drew up designs for the new St. Patrick's Cathedral, which would be completed after he left New York. The Dominican priest, Charles French, succeeded Fenwick as pastor of St. Peter's, and John Power would eventually become the next pastor of Old St. Patrick's in 1825. Fenwick became vicar general of the diocese for Bishop John Connelly in 1816, replacing Kohlmann, and remained at the post until April 1817.

== Georgetown College and South Carolina ==
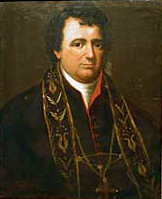
Bishop Fenwick (circa 1831)

Fenwick was named the president of Georgetown College and the pastor of Holy Trinity Church in Washington on June 28, 1817, succeeding Grassi at the former, and Francis Neale at the latter. The college's first degrees were conferred during his brief term. Later that year, Ambrose Maréchal, the Archbishop of Baltimore, sent Fenwick to Charleston, South Carolina, where there was a long-standing schism at a local Catholic church. Fenwick was replaced at Georgetown by Anthony Kohlmann, and at Holy Trinity by Theodore M. DeTheux.

Fenwick arrived in Charleston in the fall of 1818 as vicar general of the Archdiocese of Baltimore for the city. Archbishop Leonard Neale had appointed a French priest to serve as pastor at St. Mary's Parish, a predominantly Irish congregation. St. Mary's was the first Catholic parish in the state and was a prominent parish. Neale had sent the favored candidate of the congregation, an Irish priest, to a different parish. The lay trustees at St. Mary's refused to accept Neale's appointee. With tensions long-standing, the French- and English-speaking parishioners refused to attend services said in the others' language. Fenwick resolved the dispute by preaching the sermons himself, in which he would alternate between French and English. As vicar, he traveled throughout the Carolinas to minister. Fenwick remained in Charleston one year beyond the erection of the new Diocese of Charleston and the appointment of John England as the first bishop in 1820.

In May 1822, Fenwick returned to Washington, D.C. as the minister of Georgetown College and the procurator of the Jesuits in the United States. On September 15, 1825, the Jesuit mission superior, Francis Dzierozynski, again made Fenwick acting president of the college and vice rector, as the incumbent president—his brother, Enoch—refused to return to the college after leaving for St. Thomas Manor. His term as acting president lasted for just several months before he was replaced by Stephen Lariguadelle Dubuisson. Fenwick then briefly became the spiritual director of the Mount Carmel Monastery in Port Tobacco, Maryland.

== Bishop of Boston ==
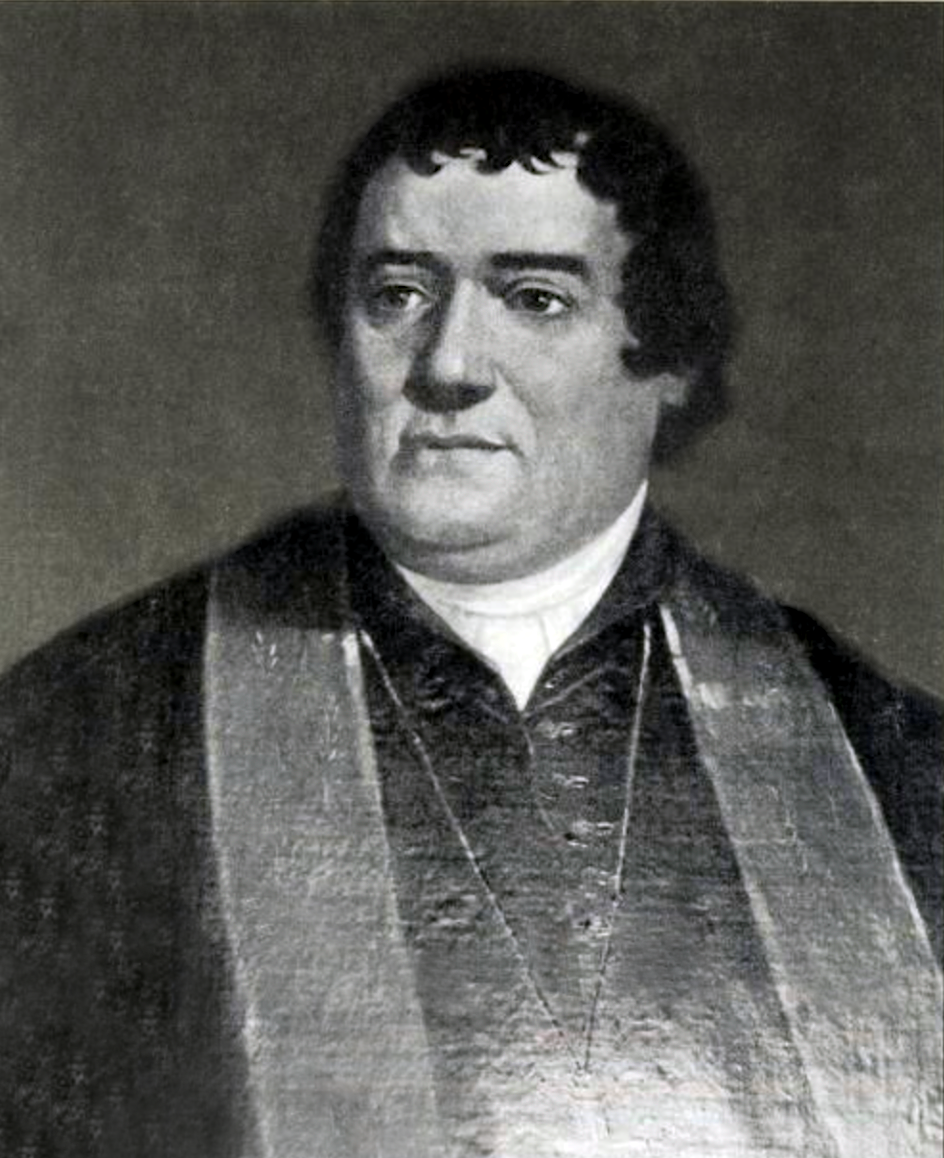
Portrait of Fenwick, c. 1846 or before

Fenwick was appointed the second Bishop of Boston by Pope Leo XII on May 10, 1825, succeeding Jean-Louis Lefebvre de Cheverus. The papal bull notifying him of his appointment arrived in July 1825, and he embarked on an eight-day spiritual retreat. Upon its completion, Fenwick was consecrated a bishop in the Cathedral of the Assumption of the Blessed Virgin Mary in Baltimore on November 1. Archbishop Ambrose Maréchal served as principal consecrator, while Bishops John England and Henry Conwell were co-consecrators. Fenwick arrived in Boston on December 3, and formally took canonical possession of the Diocese of Boston at the original Cathedral of the Holy Cross, on December 21, 1825.

Though the ecclesiastical jurisdiction of the diocese encompassed all of New England, Bishop Fenwick had only two priests under his charge, who served three Catholic churches, besides the cathedral, in all of New England: Saint Augustine's Chapel in Boston, St. Patrick's Church in Newcastle, Maine, and a small church in Claremont, New Hampshire. Throughout New England, there were approximately 10,000 Catholics. Due to significant Irish immigration, the Catholic population in the diocese grew to at least 30,000 by 1833. Fenwick traveled throughout the large territory to manage the diocese and administer the sacrament of confirmation. This included visiting Penobscot and Passamaquoddy tribes in Maine, who were largely Catholic, and were the subject of intensive proselytism by Protestant evangelists. Fenwick ordered the construction of St. Anne's Church in Old Town, Maine, for them in 1828, and sought to improve their schools.

Fenwick attended the First Provincial Council of Baltimore convened in 1829. He addressed a shortage of priests in his diocese by sending prospective seminarians to Maryland and Canada to be educated, and by incardinating several priests from other dioceses. He also trained several students in a makeshift seminary at his episcopal residence. As a result, the number of priests in the diocese had increased to 24 by 1833. At the same time, many new parishes were founded throughout New England. As in South Carolina, Fenwick was an ardent opponent of lay trusteeism in the Diocese of Boston. With a rapidly expanding Catholic population in the diocese, a portion of the territory was removed to form the Diocese of Hartford in 1843. That year, John Bernard Fitzpatrick was appointed as Fenwick's coadjutor bishop, and would later succeed him as Bishop of Boston.

By the end of Fenwick's episcopate, the number of Catholics in the Diocese of Boston (after the removal of Hartford) had increased to 70,000, in addition to 37 priests, and 44 churches. In December 1845, Fenwick's health began to decline, due to an ailment of the heart. Eight months later, he died on August 11, 1846, at the Cathedral of the Holy Cross in Boston. After the funeral, his body was carried from the Cathedral of the Holy Cross to the train station, from where it was taken to the College of the Holy Cross and buried in the school's cemetery. Bishop Fenwick High School in Peabody, Massachusetts, which opened in 1959, was named in his honor. The historic Benedict Fenwick School was a public school in Boston that operated from 1912 to 1981.

=== Educational institutions ===
One of Fenwick's primary tasks was the creation of Catholic educational institutions in Boston. He established a Sunday school at the Cathedral of the Holy Cross, where Fenwick himself catechized both children and their parents. This was followed by the establishment of a co-educational day school. The cathedral was eventually enlarged, which included the construction of two classrooms in the basement for use by these schools. Fenwick also invited the Sisters of Charity from Emmitsburg, Maryland, to Boston to educate the immigrant children of the city in 1832. Three sisters arrived on May 2, 1832, and founded the first Catholic charitable institution in Massachusetts, which consisted of an orphanage, a school for poor girls, and a Sunday school. This institution would be incorporated in 1843 as St. Vincent's Orphan Asylum, and operated until 1949.

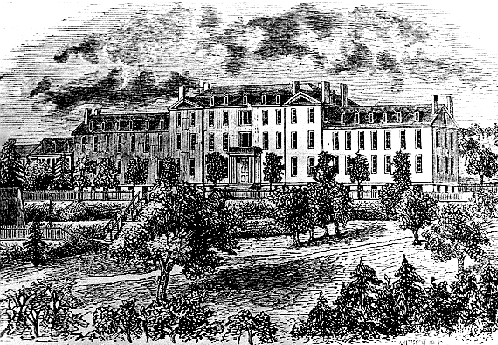
Fenwick Hall at the College of the Holy Cross, shortly after its completion (1844)

By 1830, the establishment of a Catholic college and seminary became Fenwick's highest priority. In April of the following year, he purchased land adjacent to the Boston cathedral, where he planned to open a college, but the project stalled. He desired to have the school run by the Jesuits, but in 1835, they declined his invitation, and his plan for a college was placed on hold.

In the spirit of the ongoing Restoration Movement in the United States, Fenwick purchased 11,000 acres (4,500 hectares) in Aroostook County, Maine, in 1835. The compound became known as Benedicta, and on it, lumber and grist mills as well as agriculture were begun. Fenwick's goal was to create a college in rural Maine as part of a larger utopian Catholic community. He hope that poor Irish Catholics would move to Benedicta from Boston, but they showed little interest.

Therefore, Fenwick instead decided to establish a college in Worcester, Massachusetts, on 60 acres (24 hectares) of land owned by the local priest, James Fitton. Fenwick purchased the land from Fitton in 1842, and named the new school the College of the Holy Cross, in honor of the original Boston cathedral. This property was then supplemented, bringing its total to 96 acres (39 hectares), and in 1843, Fenwick entrusted the new college to a party of Jesuits sent from Georgetown College. That year, construction of the college's first building began, which would later become known as Fenwick Hall.

=== Catholic media ===
Fenwick established several Catholic newspapers in the diocese. The first was The Catholic Press, which was founded in 1829 in Hartford, Connecticut, and survived for five years. Another was The Expostulator, which was established in 1830, and was written for young people; this publication survived for only two years. Fenwick's most enduring newspaper was The Jesuit, or Catholic Sentinel, which was founded in Boston in 1829. It later became known as The Pilot, which is today the oldest extant Catholic newspaper in the United States.

He also assisted in editing the Catholic Laity's Directory, which was produced by John Power, the vicar general of New York, in 1822. Fenwick wrote a history of the Diocese of Boston from its founding to 1829, titled "Memoirs to Serve for the Future Ecclesiastical History of the Diocess of Boston," but this was never published during his lifetime. He also directed many historical Catholic books to be reprinted for the diocese.

=== Anti-Catholicism in New England ===
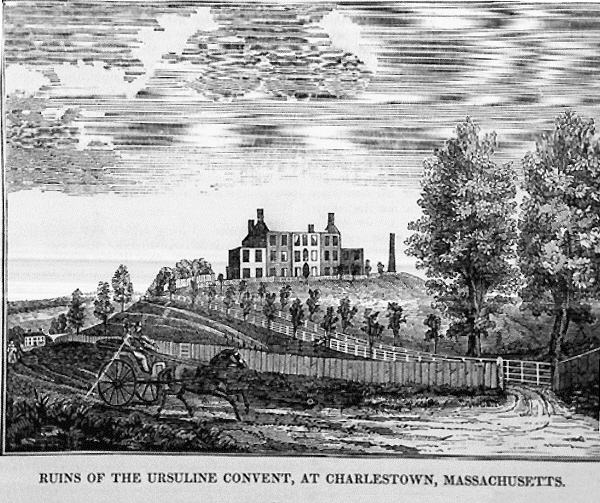
Ruins of the Ursuline convent in Charlestown after the riot of 1834

A convent of Ursuline nuns, which also conducted a free school for poor girls, was located next to the Boston cathedral. As their facilities were inadequate, Fenwick purchased a new property for the nuns in Charlestown, today located in East Somerville. The purchase was made on July 17, 1826, and the nuns erected a new convent and school there, completing their move in 1828. They named it the Convent and Academy of Mount Benedict, in honor of the bishop. As the nuns' vow of enclosure did not allow them to actively manage the construction of the new facilities, or their expansion in 1829, Fenwick oversaw much of the work. With the change in location came a change in mission; the school began charging tuition, and though it admitted some students for free, it sought to primarily educate the daughters of the elite Protestant residents of Charlestown.

Nativism and anti-Catholicism were rampant in Greater Boston at this time. Lurid rumors that Catholic convents were dens of immorality were prevalent; among these were allegations that convents imprisoned women against their will, murdered babies, and concealed sexual deviance. While upper-class Protestants were willing to send their daughters to the Catholic academy, lower-class Protestants, particularly Congregationalists, were distrustful of the school. These tensions led to the Ursuline Convent riots. On August 10, 1834, posters were displayed in the neighborhood that declared an ultimatum: unless the convent were investigated by the board of selectmen of Charlestown, it would be "demolished" by the "Truckmen of Boston." The following day, authorities were sent to inspect the convent. As they left, a mob of 2,000, wearing masks or painted faces, encircled the convent. They threw bricks through the windows, stole precious objects from the interior, and then lit it ablaze; the nuns fled. The fire department, which largely shared the attitudes of the rioters, arrived but did not attempt to extinguish the fire. The convent's adjacent graveyard was attacked as well. All but one of the perpetrators were acquitted in a subsequent jury trial. The Massachusetts legislature refused to redress the destruction of the convent.

Anti-Catholic sentiment in the city only increased after the convent riots, which caused the Ursuline nuns to flee to Canada. Tensions steadily grew until some feared the outbreak of a religious war. The Charlestown selectmen banned Catholics from being buried in the Catholic cemetery Fenwick established on Bunker Hill. An effigy of Bishop Fenwick was shot with guns in 1835, and threats were made on his life. Widespread violence and destruction occurred during the Broad Street Riot of 1837, and Irish Catholics took up arms as the Montgomery Guards. Another burning of a Catholic church occurred in 1838 in Burlington, Vermont.

=== Dispute at St. Mary's Church ===
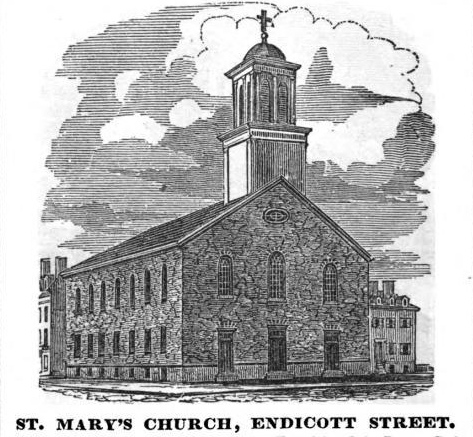
After intense conflict, Fenwick placed St. Mary's Church in Boston under interdict.

Fenwick's episcopate involved numerous conflicts both among parishioners over control of their respective churches, and between parishioners and the bishop. Some of these disputes turned violent, and involved calls for leaving the Catholic Church to create new churches.

One such dispute arose at St. Mary's Church in the North End of Boston in 1840. That year, Patrick O'Beirne and Thomas J. O'Flaherty were appointed co-pastors of the predominantly Irish church. The parish quickly became polarized, with parishioners supporting either O'Flaherty, who advocated strong lay control of the church, or O'Beirne, who advocated episcopal control. Divisions were further deepened by O'Flaherty's support of the temperance movement and opposition to the Acts of Union 1800, which united Ireland and Great Britain. By 1842, the congregation was so divided that Fenwick worried violence might erupt. Therefore, he attempted to restore peace by personally visiting the church, threatening excommunication for disobedience of church authorities, banning mass protests, and ordering the two pastors to publicly reconcile. Eventually, Fenwick transferred O'Beirne to Providence, Rhode Island, at O'Beirne's request.

None of these efforts was effective in restoring tranquility, and on February 20, 1842, O'Beirne's supporters began a riot during a vespers service over which O'Flaherty presided. The perpetrators were arrested and prosecuted, and Fenwick placed the parish under interdict for two weeks. He then transferred O'Flaherty to Salem, Massachusetts, and removed O'Beirne from Providence. Though O'Flaherty's supporters demanded his return, and organized regular train rides to visit him, the dispute at St. Mary's came to an end.

Catholic Church titles
First	Pastor of St. Patrick's Old Cathedral; 1809–1815 with Anthony Kohlmann	Vacant Title next held by John Power
Preceded by Anthony Kohlmann	Pastor of St. Peter's Church; 1815–1816	Succeeded by Charles Ffrench
Preceded by Anthony Kohlmann	Diocesan Administrator of the Diocese of New York; 1815	Succeeded by John Connolly as Bishop of New York
Preceded by Anthony Kohlmann	Vicar General of the Diocese of New York; 1816–1817	Succeeded by –
Preceded by Francis Neale	2nd Pastor of Holy Trinity Church; 1817–1818	Succeeded by Theodore M. DeTheux
Preceded by Jean-Louis Lefebvre de Cheverus	2nd Bishop of Boston; 1825–1846	Succeeded by John Bernard Fitzpatrick
Academic offices
Preceded by Giovanni Antonio Grassi	10th President of Georgetown College; 1817	Succeeded by Anthony Kohlmann
Preceded by Enoch Fenwick	13th President of Georgetown College; 1825	Succeeded by Stephen Larigaudelle Dubuisson
