= Anthony Kohlmann =

Alsatian Jesuit educator and missionary

The Reverend Anthony Kohlmann SJ
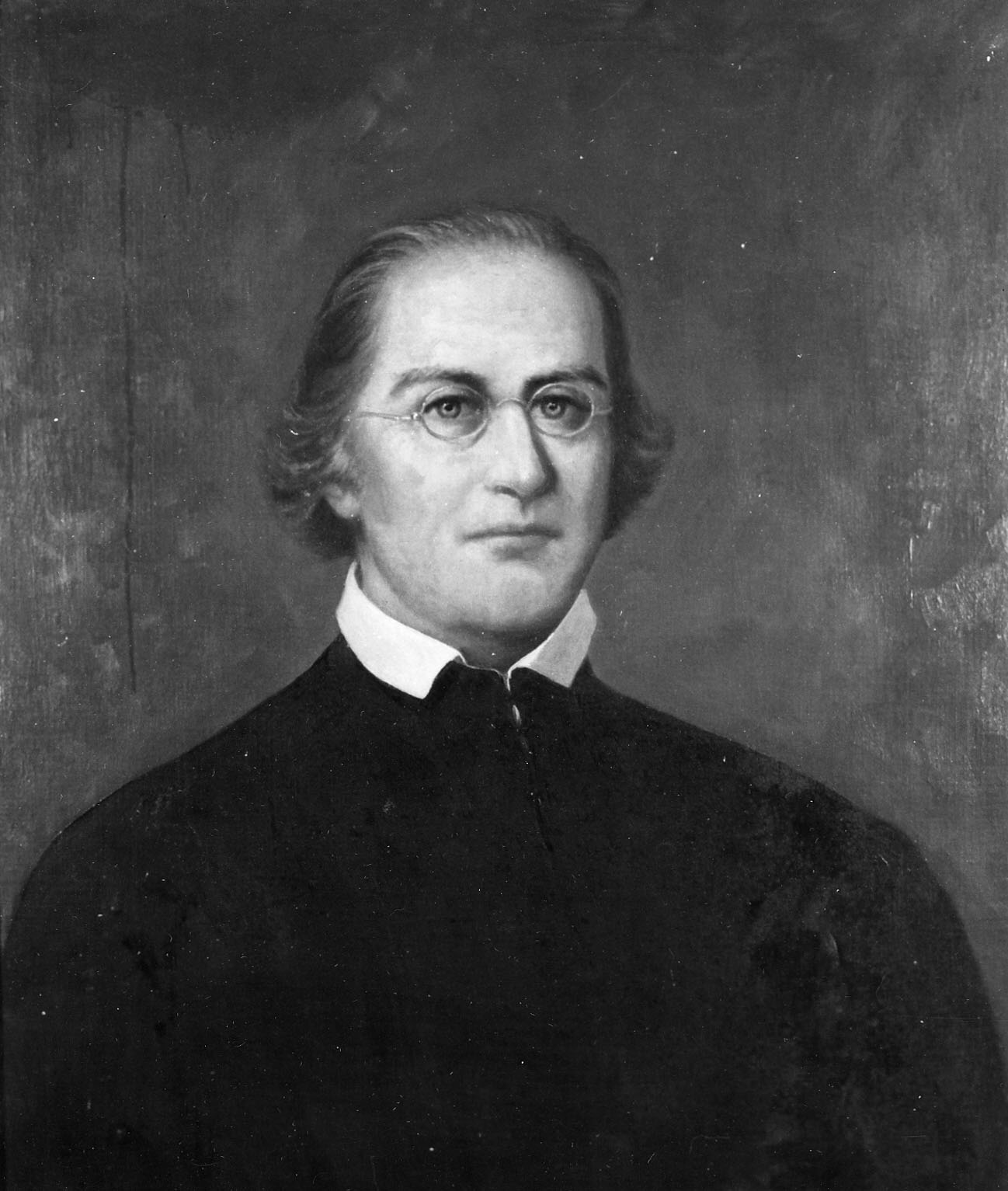

11th President of Georgetown College
- In office 1817–1820
- Preceded by: Benedict Joseph Fenwick
- Succeeded by: Enoch Fenwick

Personal details
- Born: Anton Kohlmann; July 13, 1771 Kaysersberg, Alsace, Kingdom of France
- Died: April 11, 1836 (aged 64) Rome, Papal States
- Education: Collège Saint-Michel

Orders
- Ordination: April 1796

Anthony Kohlmann SJ (born Anton; July 13, 1771 – April 11, 1836) was an Alsatian Catholic priest, missionary, theologian, and Jesuit educator. He played a decisive role in the early formation of the Archdiocese of New York, where he was the subject of a lawsuit that for the first time recognized the confessional privilege in the United States, and served as the president of Georgetown College from 1817 to 1820.

Kohlmann joined the Society of the Sacred Heart and ministered throughout Europe before entering the Society of Jesus. He left for the United States in 1806, where he taught at Georgetown College and ministered to German-speaking congregations in the mid-Atlantic region. In 1808, he became the pastor of New York City's only Catholic church, and then was made the apostolic administrator and first vicar general of the newly created Diocese of New York. He established the diocese's first cathedral in 1809. Kohlmann also founded a school, the New York Literary Institution; established an orphanage; and invited the first Ursuline nuns to the United States.

In 1813, the City of New York sought to compel Kohlmann to disclose the identity of a thief, which he learned during a confession. In a landmark decision, the state court ruled that he could not be compelled to violate the seal of the confessional, recognizing the confessional privilege for the first time in the United States. Kohlmann returned to Maryland in 1815 as superior of the Jesuits' Maryland Mission and president of Georgetown College. Three years later, he left Georgetown to establish the Washington Seminary, which became Gonzaga College High School. In 1824, Pope Leo XII named Kohlmann the chair of theology at the Pontifical Gregorian University in Rome. Kohlmann later became a consultor to the College of Cardinals and various curial congregations, and was then appointed Qualificator of the Inquisition.

== Early life ==
Anton Kohlmann was born on July 13, 1771, in Kaysersberg, in the region of Alsace in the Kingdom of France. As a youth, he began his studies in the nearby town of Colmar. He joined the Capuchin order, but fled to Switzerland because the order was persecuted as part of the larger dechristianization of France during the French Revolution. He completed his theological studies at the Collège Saint-Michel, and was ordained a priest in Fribourg in April 1796. Kohlmann's brother, Paul, also became a priest and would join him in the United States.

=== Ministry ===
Shortly after his ordination, he joined the Society of the Sacred Heart, (Note: The Society of the Sacred Heart was founded by two seminarians, Joseph Varin and Joseph de Tournély. Its early members were primarily former Jesuits, who joined after the suppression of the Society of Jesus in 1773. The Society of the Sacred Heart merged into the Society of the Faith of Jesus in 1799, which then disbanded in 1814.) and completed his novitiate period in Göggingen, located in the Holy Roman Empire. He ministered throughout Austria for two years, during which he drew commendations for his work in Hagenbrunn during a plague. He then went to Italy, where he was chaplain at a military hospital in Pavia for two years. Kohlmann was sent to Bavaria in 1801, where he became the director of the Ecclesiastical Seminary at Dillingen. He then spent time as the rector of a college in Berlin, before founding a college in Amsterdam, which was run by the Society of the Faith of Jesus, an order with which the Society of the Sacred Heart had merged in 1799.

Kohlmann applied for admission to the Society of Jesus, which, despite its worldwide suppression since 1773, had been operating in the Russian Empire. During the two years that his application being considered, he resided at Kensington College in London, where he learned English. He eventually was instructed to travel to Russia, and he arrived in Riga in June 1805. He entered the Jesuit novitiate in Daugavpils on June 21, 1803, where he spent only a year before the superiors were satisfied that he was academically qualified. The following year, John Carroll, the Bishop of Baltimore, put out a call for additional Jesuits in the United States, and Kohlmann was sent as a missionary, prior to taking his final vows.

== Missionary to the United States ==
Kohlmann left Hamburg on August 20, 1806, arrived in Baltimore on November 4. In the United States, he began anglicizing his name as Anthony. The Jesuit Superior General formally permitted the Jesuits to be restored in the United States in 1805, and a novitiate was opened the following year at Georgetown College in Washington, D.C. Francis Neale was named the master of novices, and Kohlmann, though still a novice himself, was made the socius (Note: The socius magistri novitiorum is the associate to the master of novices, and is responsible for the day-to-day affairs of the novices.) to the master of novices. He was also assigned to teach philosophy.

Kohlmann introduced many of the customs that the Jesuits in exile the Russian Empire observed. While at Georgetown, he made trips to minister to the people of Alexandria, Virginia, and Baltimore, as well as to German-speaking congregations in rural Pennsylvania. He also heard confessions from parishioners at Holy Trinity Church in Philadelphia because their pastor had not mastered the English language.

== New York ==
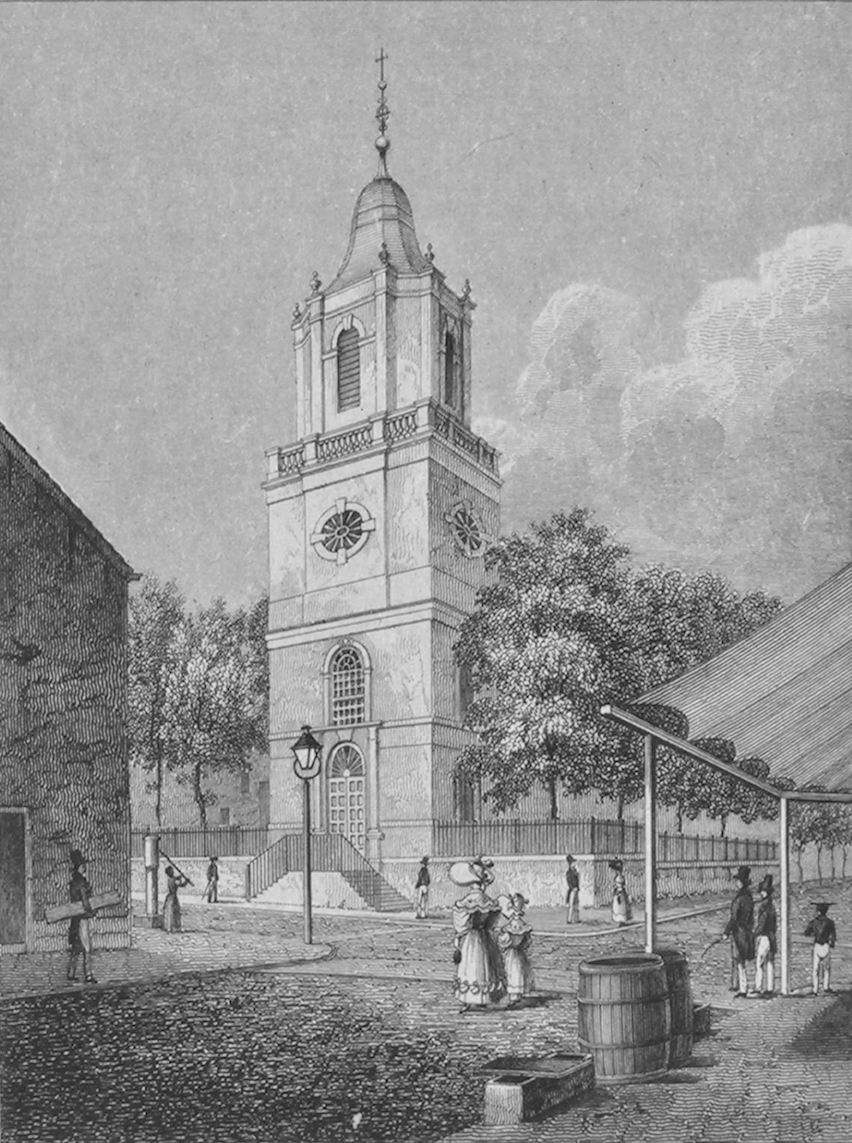
St. Peter's Church (pictured) was the only Catholic church in New York City when Kohlmann became its pastor in 1808.

Bishop Carroll found it difficult to govern a diocese whose territory encompassed the entire United States. The church in New York suffered neglect and mismanagement, and he had repeatedly requested that the authorities in Rome remove New York to form a separate diocese. Before news could arrive that his request was granted and R. Luke Concanen was appointed as the first Bishop of New York, (Note: R. Luke Concanen was appointed Bishop of New York and consecrated on April 24, 1808, but word of his appointment would not reach Carroll until September 24, 1808.) Carroll sent a party of clergy to New York City. Headed by Kohlmann, it consisted of the future bishop Benedict Fenwick and four Jesuit scholastics. Arriving in October 1808, Kohlmann assumed pastoral responsibility for approximately 14,000 Catholics, who were primarily Irish, French, and German. Upon his arrival, Kohlmann found New York suffering an economic depression resulting from the Embargo Act of 1807.

Kohlmann became the pastor of St. Peter's Church, replacing Matthew Byrne, who sought to be relieved so that he could join the Society of Jesus. There, he celebrated Masses for the English, French, and German speaking parishioners. He also was prolific in administering the other sacraments, visiting hospitals, and teaching catechesis. He also created a subscription among parishioners to raise money for the poor.

Kohlmann determined that St. Peter's was inadequate to serve the entire Catholic population of New York City. He began establishing a new church that would serve as the cathedral of the diocese. He purchased land on what were then the outskirts of New York City, adjoining farmland at the edge of the city. The cornerstone of the St. Patrick's Old Cathedral was laid on June 8, 1809. He oversaw its completion and gave it the name of St. Patrick. In 1809, he became the cathedral's first pastor, alongside Fenwick. Upon its completion, Old St. Patrick's became the largest and most ornate church in New York State. By this time, Cooncanen still had not yet arrived from Europe, delayed by the Napoleonic Wars. Therefore, on October 11 of that year, upon Bishop Concanen's request, John Carroll named Kohlmann the first vicar general of the Diocese of New York.

In 1809, in the course of their pastoral duties, Kohlmann and Fenwick were called to the deathbed of the American revolutionary and avowed atheist Thomas Paine, who hoped that the priests would be able to heal him. When they attempted to persuade him to disavow his atheist beliefs, Paine became enraged and expelled them from his house. In 1810, Bishop Concanen died in Naples, having never reached his diocese in America. Therefore, Kohlmann was made apostolic administrator of the diocese. When it appeared that Concanen's successor, John Connolly, would arrive in the United States, Kohlmann was recalled to Maryland in January 1815. He was succeeded by Fenwick as vicar general and administrator of New York and pastor of St. Peter's Church.

=== New York Literary Institution ===
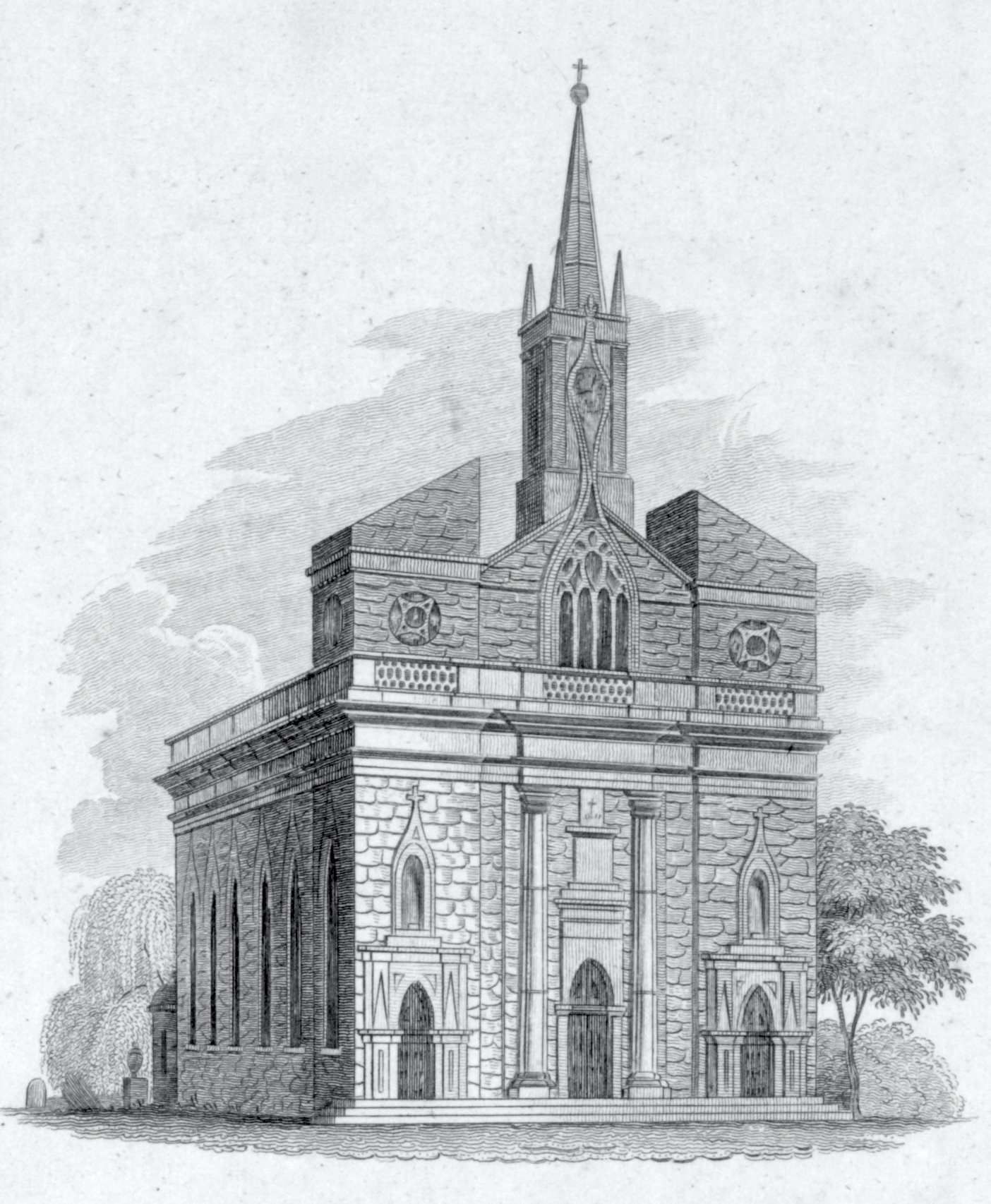
Kohlmann founded both the New York Literary Institution and what was then St. Patrick's Cathedral (pictured), which were across the street from each other.

In addition to his pastoral work, Carroll charged Kohlmann with establishing a Catholic college in the city. In 1808, he opened a classical school called the New York Literary Institution, which functioned as an offshoot of Georgetown College. He rented a house on Mulberry Street, across from the cathedral, where the four Jesuit scholastics began teaching 35 Catholic and Protestant students, a minority of whom boarded at the school. With the school outgrowing its location, in September 1809, it moved to Broadway, and, in March of the following year, Kohlmann relocated the school far into the countryside of New York City, across the street from the Elgin Botanic Garden. The new site of the New York Literary Institution would later house the new St. Patrick's Cathedral in Midtown Manhattan. Following its move, the school began to prosper. Kohlmann, however, continued to reside at Mulberry Street, where he could perform his pastoral duties at Old St. Patrick's and St. Peter's. He made Benedict Fenwick the president of the school.

Kohlmann became convinced that New York City would remain the preeminent city in the United States and that the Jesuits should shift their ministerial efforts to it, rather than focus on their rural plantations in Maryland, which he described as "graveyards for Europeans". He went so far as to advocate the relocation of Georgetown College to New York, which he argued was of "greater importance to the Society than all the other states together". Before long, the Jesuit superiors in Maryland determined that there were not enough Jesuits to staff both the New York school and Georgetown. Despite Kohlmann's protestations, the New York Literary Institution was disbanded in 1813, and the Jesuits were recalled to Maryland.

In addition to the New York Literary Institution, Kohlmann established a school for girls in April 1812 near the literary institution. The school was put under the care of the Ursuline nuns, whom he had invited from County Cork, Ireland, to run the new school. The nuns accepted Kohlmann's invitation on the condition that they would remain only as long as they received novices for their order. Their arrival marked the Ursuline order's first presence in the United States. When their desire for novices did not materialize, the nuns returned to Ireland three years after their arrival. Kohlmann also established an orphanage, which he placed under the care of Trappist nuns who had fled persecution in France. This institution was short-lived, as the Trappists left for Le Havre in October 1814.

=== Seal of the confessional ===
In 1813, Kohlmann became the subject of a lawsuit that rose to the national interest. A New York City merchant, James Keating, accused a man named Phillips and Phillips' wife of stealing goods from him. The police prosecuted the two accused, but before the trial could be brought to a close, Keating declared that he had been paid restitution, with Kohlmann acting as an intermediary in the transaction. The New York County District Attorney subpoenaed Kohlmann to provide the name of the thief who paid the restitution, but Kohlmann refused to reveal his identity, stating that it had been disclosed to him during the Sacrament of Penance and was therefore protected under canon law by the seal of the confessional. In response to the district attorney's demand that he disclose the thief, Kohlmann stated that he would suffer imprisonment or death before violating the seal.

Kohlmann was brought before the Court of General Sessions to compel him to provide the identity of the thief. He was represented by two Protestant defense attorneys: Richard Riker and William Sampson, an exiled United Irishman. The four judges, DeWitt Clinton, Josiah Ogden Hoffman, Richard Cunnin, and Isaac Douglas, ruled in favor of Kohlmann, citing religious liberty as the basis of their decision. Speaking for a unanimous court, DeWitt Clinton wrote:

It is essential to the free exercise of religion, that its ordinances should be administered—that its ceremonies as well as its essentials should be protected... Secrecy is the essence of penance. The sinner will not confess, nor will the priest receive his confession, if the veil of secrecy is removed.

The court's decision represented the first legal recognition of the confessional privilege in the United States. As a result, the New York State Legislature passed a law on December 10, 1828, codifying the confessional privilege: that when clergy members come to know of facts through their ministerial capacity and their denomination imposes a requirement of secrecy, they cannot be compelled to reveal those facts. Kohlmann also wrote a book directed at non-Catholics, explaining the Catholic doctrine on the Sacrament of Penance.

== Maryland and Washington, D.C. ==
Upon his arrival in Maryland in 1815, Kohlmann was made the master of novices at the novitiate at White Marsh Manor. Shortly after that, Giovanni Antonio Grassi left Maryland for Rome, and Kohlmann succeeded him as the superior of the Jesuits' Maryland Mission on September 10, 1817. As superior, Kohlmann advocated selling the Jesuits' plantations in rural Maryland to finance the establishment of other colleges in the major American cities. The Anglo-American Jesuits fiercely opposed this proposal. Disagreements between the Continental European Jesuits in the United States and the Anglo-American ones became so entrenched that the Jesuit Superior General sent the Irish Jesuit Peter Kenney as an ecclesiastical visitor. He also assumed Kohlmann's role of mission superior on April 23, 1819.

=== Georgetown College ===
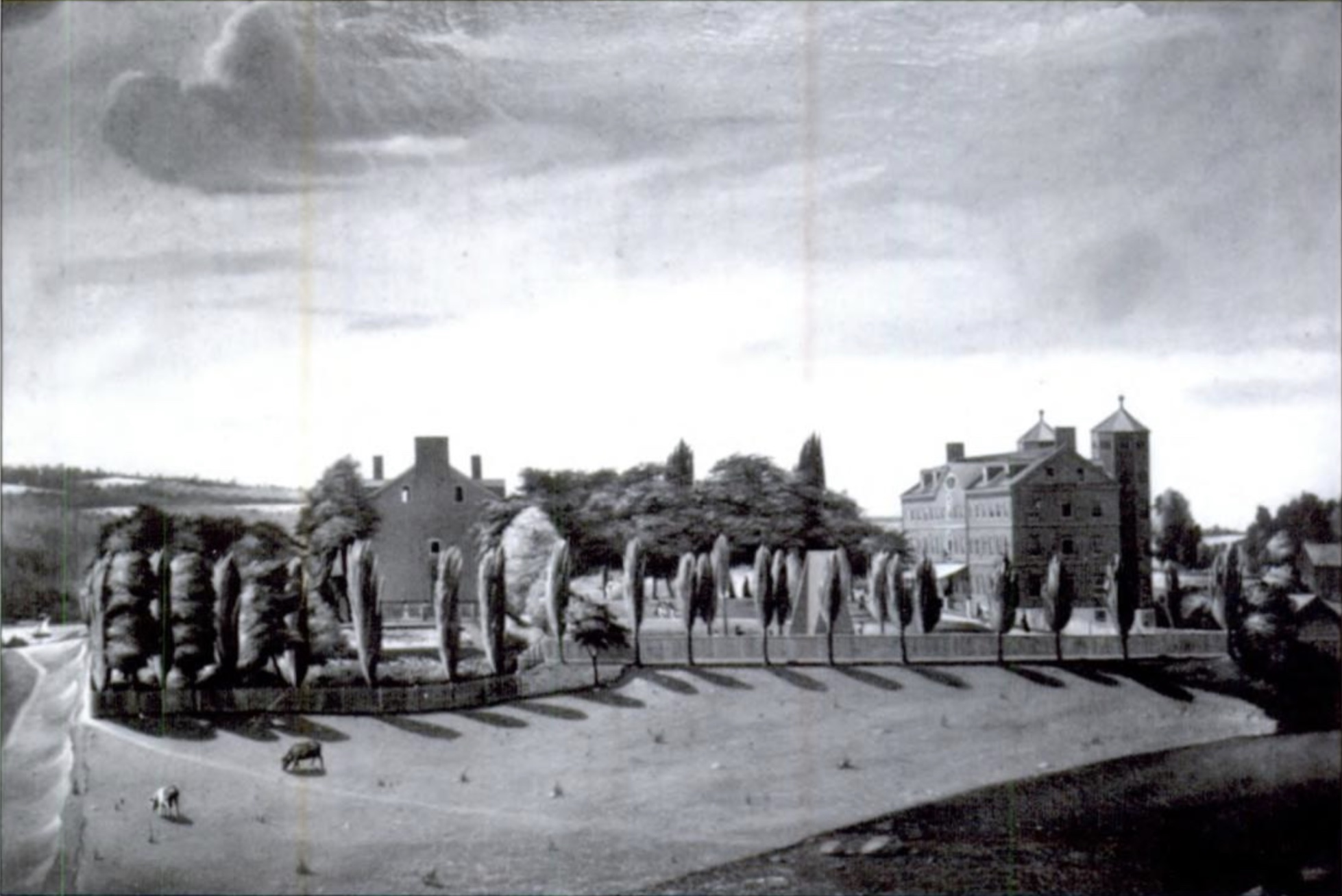
Early depiction of Georgetown College's campus, with Old North on the right.

When Benedict Fenwick left for Rome in 1817, Kohlmann was selected to succeed him as president of Georgetown College. Though Kohlmann remained convinced that the Jesuits must close Georgetown to concentrate their meager resources on the training of Jesuits, he did not attempt to close the college while in office. Kohlmann aligned with the European Jesuits who advocated a rigorous classical curriculum that placed a special emphasis on Latin and Ancient Greek, while the Anglo-American Jesuits supported a diminished emphasis on the classics in favor of mathematics and science. He also encouraged proselytization of the Protestant students, to which their parents and some of the Anglo-American Jesuits objected.

During his administration, the number of students enrolled at the college declined somewhat. This was due in large part to the Panic of 1819 and partly to the strict discipline that Kohlmann enforced, which resulted in a significant number of students being expelled or transferring out. In 1818, students at the college staged a revolt by plotting to kill the prefect of students, Stephen Larigaudelle Dubuisson, who was responsible for maintaining discipline. While such conspiracies had become frequent at other American colleges, this was the first time such a design had appeared at a Catholic college. However, the plot was discovered before it could be acted upon, and Kohlmann expelled the six conspirators. Overall, his leadership of the college was not considered successful. Kohlmann's term as president of the college ended in 1820, and he was succeeded by Enoch Fenwick.

=== Washington Seminary ===
In 1819, a building was constructed next to St. Patrick's Church in downtown Washington, D.C. It was to serve as the home of the Washington Seminary, which was envisioned as a standalone Jesuit novitiate, to alleviate overcrowding at Georgetown. This never came to fruition, however, and the building went unused for one or two years. Instead, the novitiate found another location, and the Washington Seminary opened as a Jesuit scholasticate under Kohlmann's leadership. He became the first president and rector of the school on August 15, 1820, and also assumed the position of professor of dogma.

Soon after its founding, prominent Catholics in the area petitioned Kohlmann to open the school to lay students, which he did. The first lay students enrolled on September 1, 1821, alongside the Jesuit scholastics. Kohlmann admitted day students reluctantly and out of financial necessity, as it violated a law of the Jesuit order that forbade them from accepting compensation for educating youths. As a result of it no longer being exclusively for priestly training, the school would later become Gonzaga College High School. The school prospered and came to be the preeminent day school in Washington.

In response to the writings of the Unitarian minister Jared Sparks, which were aimed at Baltimore readers, Kohlmann published an apologetical book titled Unitarianism, Theologically and Philosophically Considered. The book was well received in Catholic circles; several editions were published, and it was considered sufficiently authoritative to be read aloud in the refectory of St. Mary's Seminary in Baltimore. Kohlmann's tenure as president came to an end in 1824 when he was recalled to Rome by Pope Leo XII, and he was succeeded by Adam Marshall.

Kohlmann became involved in the purported miraculous cure of Ann Mattingly, the sister of Thomas Carbery, the Mayor of the District of Columbia. Kohlmann instructed her to pray a novena in union with the German Prince Alexander von Hohenlohe, who had gained a reputation as a miracle worker. On March 10, 1824, Mattingly was restored to health. Despite wariness by Archbishop Ambrose Maréchal and William Matthews (Mattingly's pastor), Kohlmann was the most emphatic priest in declaring the cure a miracle and published an account of it in a Baltimore newspaper. Seeking to have the miracle declare true, he would later arrange an audience with Pope Leo XII, in which the pope was impressed by the event and ordered a pamphlet about it translated into Italian and published.

== Roman career ==
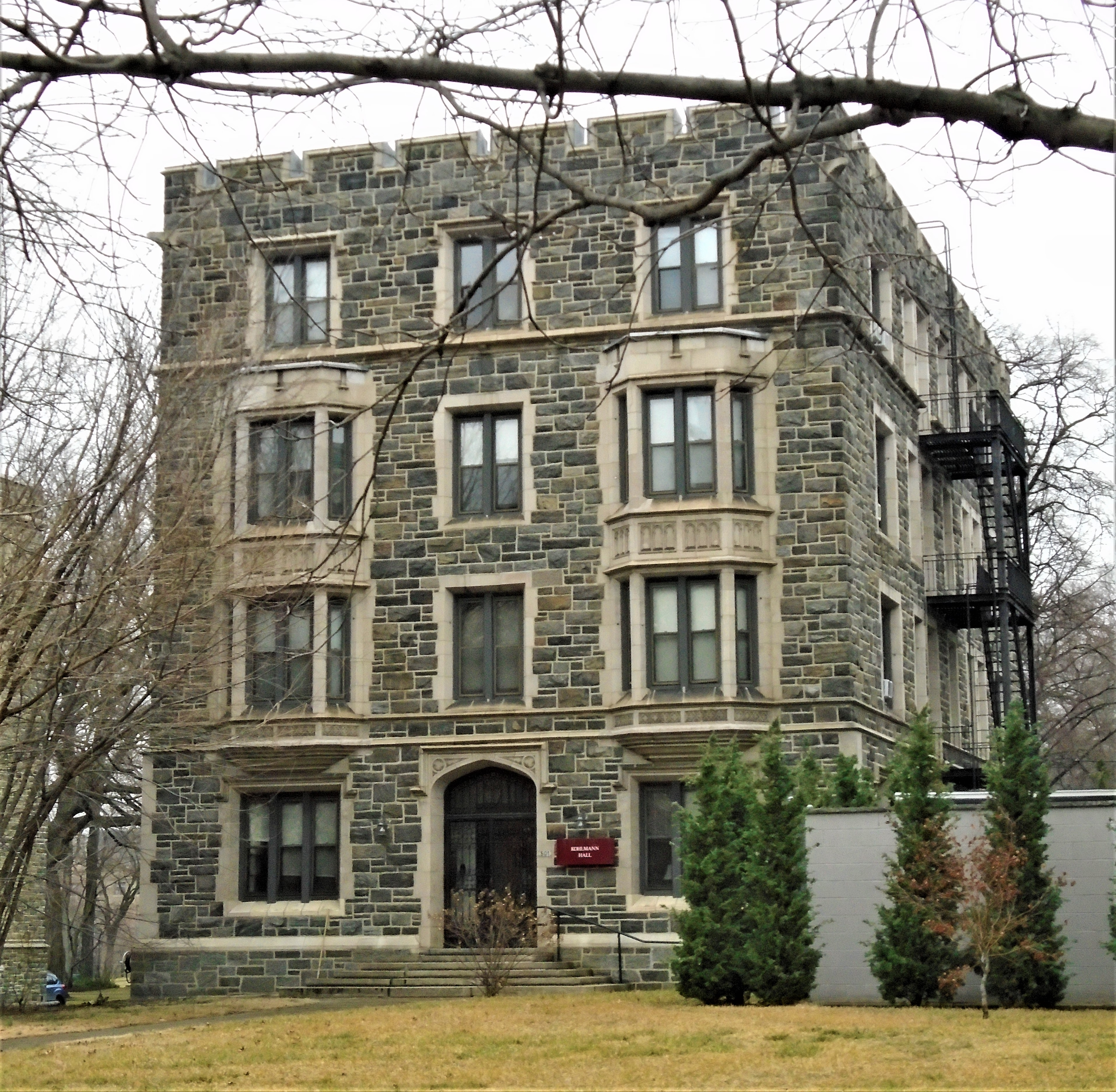
Kohlmann Hall at Fordham University was constructed in 1923.

In 1824, Pope Leo XII placed the Pontifical Gregorian University under the care of the Society of Jesus, as it had been before the order's suppression. Impressed by Kohlmann's book on Unitarianism, he named Kohlmann as the university's chair of theology. He held this post for five years, during which time one of his students was Vincenzo Gioacchino Pecci, who would go on to become Pope Leo XIII; another was Paul Cullen, who would become the Archbishop of Dublin and the first Irish cardinal.

Kohlmann's inquisition of Pecci during the latter's public academic defense again caught the attention of the pope, who named him a consultor to the Congregation for Extraordinary Ecclesiastical Affairs and the Congregation of Bishops and Regulars. He also became a consultor to the staff of the College of Cardinals. Pope Gregory XVI promoted him within the curial staff to the position of Qualificator of the Inquisition and considered making him a cardinal. In 1830, he resigned and spent a year as spiritual director at the Roman College. Kohlmann retired to the Jesuit house attached to the Church of the Gesù in 1831, where he served as confessor, aided by his knowledge of several languages. In 1833, he met the future theologian Augustin Theiner; along with the future cardinal Karl-August von Reisach, Kohlmann influenced Theiner's decision to convert to Catholicism.

By 1836, Kohlmann's health had begun to deteriorate, and he died on April 11, 1836. Kohlmann Hall at Fordham University was constructed in 1923 and named in his honor. Originally the headquarters of the Jesuit Order's New York province, it was later converted into the residence for Jesuits teaching at Fordham Preparatory School.

== Notes ==
Catholic Church titles
Preceded by Matthew Byrne	Pastor of St. Peter's Church; 1808–1815	Succeeded by Benedict Joseph Fenwick
First	Vicar General of the Diocese of New York; 1809–1815	Succeeded by Benedict Joseph Fenwick
First	Pastor of St. Patrick's Old Cathedral; 1809–1815 with Benedict Joseph Fenwick	Vacant Title next held by John Power
Preceded by R. Luke Concanen as Bishop of New York	Apostolic Administrator of the Diocese of New York; 1810–1815	Succeeded by Benedict Joseph Fenwick
Preceded by Giovanni Antonio Grassi	24th Superior of the Jesuit Maryland Mission; 1817–1819	Succeeded by Peter Kenney
Academic offices
Preceded by Benedict Joseph Fenwick	11th President of Georgetown College; 1817–1820	Succeeded by Enoch Fenwick
New office	1st President of the Washington Seminary; 1820–1824	Succeeded by Adam Marshall
