= Confessional privilege (United States) =

Secrecy of religious confessions in U.S. law

In United States law, confessional privilege is a rule of evidence that forbids the inquiry into the content or even existence of certain communications between clergy and church members.

It grows out of the common law and statutory enactments which may vary between jurisdictions.

== Statute ==
All fifty states, the District of Columbia, and the federal government have enacted statutory privileges providing that at least some communications between clergyman and parishioners are privileged.

== Common law ==
Prior to the adoption of statutory protections, there was some protection under common law.

- New York: In People v. Phillips (1 Southwest L. J., 90), in the year 1813, the Court of General Sessions in New York recognized the privilege as in a decision rendered by De Witt Clinton, recognized the privilege as applying to Rev. Anthony Kohlmann, S.J., who refused to reveal in court information received under the seal of confession. (Incidentally, the successful argument in favor of the privilege was made by William Sampson, a Protestant lawyer exiled from Ireland for defending Catholics.)

There is also Smith's case reported in the "New York City Hall Recorder", vol. II, p. 77, which, apparently, was decided in the same way.

- Massachusetts: In Commonwealth v. Drake [(1818) 15 Mass., 154], it was argued on the one side that a confession of a criminal offence made penitentially by a member of a certain Church to other members, in accordance with the discipline of that Church, may not be given in evidence. These others (who were not clergy) were called as witnesses. The solicitor-general argued that religious confession was not protected from disclosure. He also took the point that in this case "the confession was not to the church nor required by any known ecclesiastical rule", but was made voluntarily to friends and neighbors. The court held that the evidence was rightly received (not protected).

== Issues ==
The privilege is defined in over 50 separate statutes and may therefore vary in important ways:

- Who qualifies as a member of the clergy
- What communications are covered by the privilege
- Who holds the privilege

The Child Welfare Information Gateway states that the privilege of maintaining this confidentiality under State law must be provided by statute. Most States provide for clergy–penitent privilege within rules of evidence or civil procedure.

== See also ==
- Privilege (evidence)
- Confidentiality
- Duty of confidentiality
- Admissible evidence
- Priest–penitent privilege
