= Gonzaga College High School =

Catholic school in Washington, D.C., United States

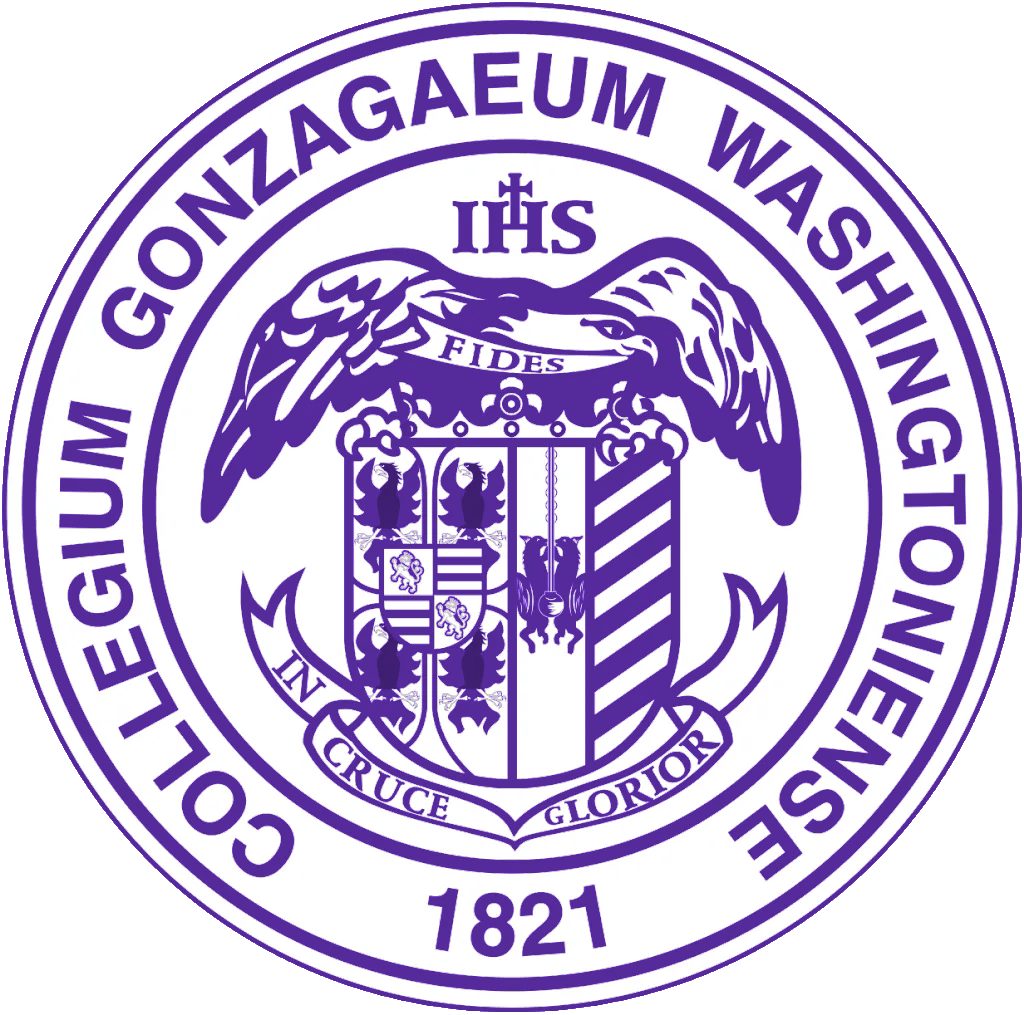

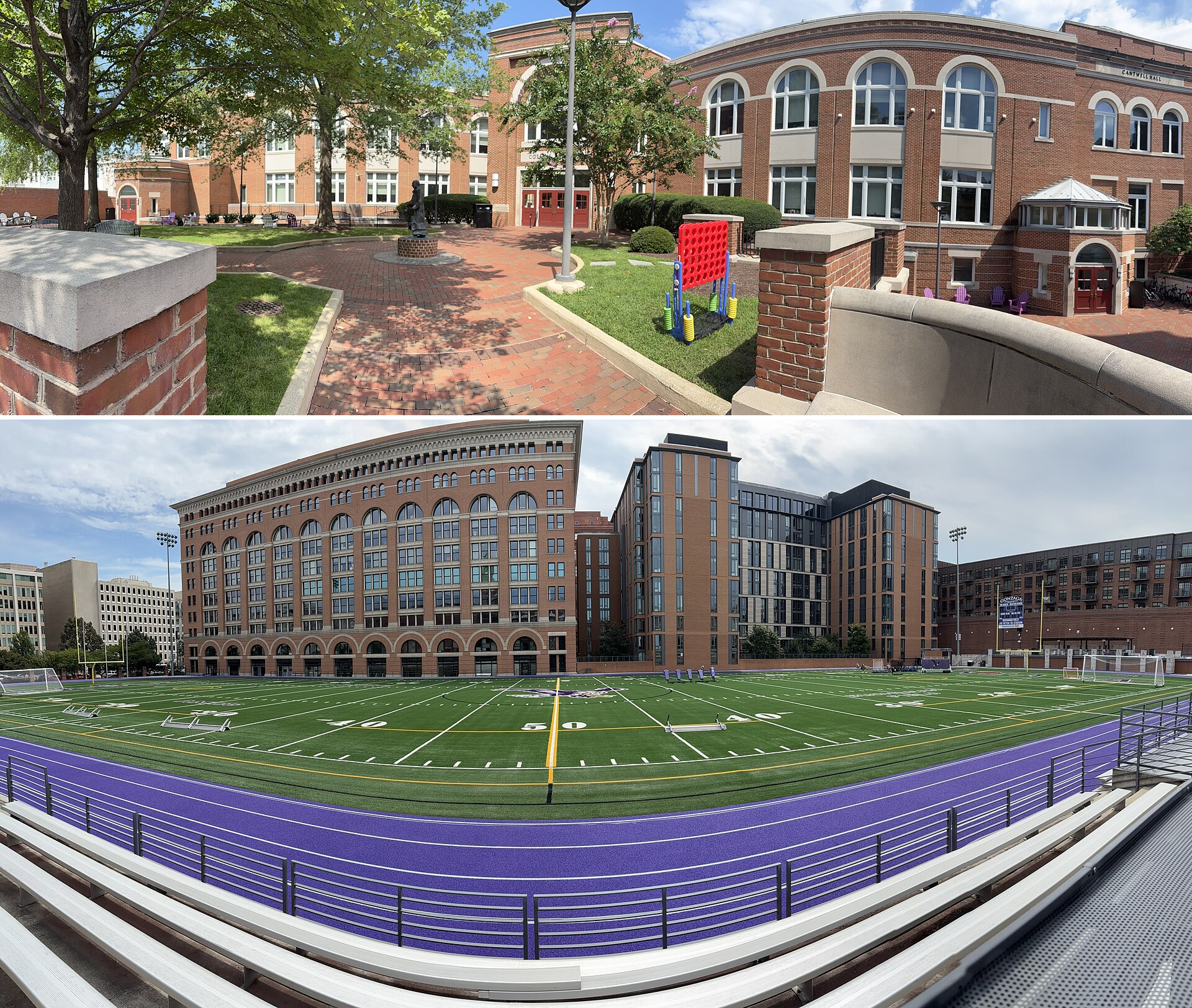
- 2 panoramic images of Cantwell-Ruesch Hall and Buchanan Field.

Location
- 19 I Street Northwest; Washington, D.C. 20001; United States; 38°54′06″N 77°00′38″W

Information
- Former names: Washington Seminary; Gonzaga College
- Type: Private Catholic All-male college-preparatory day school
- Motto: Latin: Ad maiorem Dei gloriam English: For the Greater Glory of God
- Religious affiliation: Roman Catholic (Jesuit)
- Patron saint: St. Aloysius Gonzaga
- Established: 1821 (205 years ago)
- Founder: Anthony Kohlmann, S.J.
- School district: Archdiocese of Washington Catholic Schools
- CEEB code: 090085
- President: Fr. Joseph E. Lingan, S.J.
- Headmaster: Thomas K. Every, II
- Faculty: 81.1 (on an FTE basis) (2019–20)
- Gender: All-male
- Enrollment: 964 (2019–20)
  - Grade 9: 244
  - Grade 10: 248
  - Grade 11: 237
  - Grade 12: 235
- Student to teacher ratio: 11.9 (2019–20)
- Colors: Purple and white
- Song: Alma mater
- Athletics conference: WCAC
- Team name: Eagles
- Rival: St. John's College High School
- Accreditation: MSA
- Publication: The Gonzaga Magazine
- Newspaper: The Aquilian
- Endowment: $65,000,000
- Tuition: $31,630
- Website: www.gonzaga.org

Gonzaga College High School is a private Catholic college-preparatory high school for boys in Washington, D.C. Founded by the Jesuits in 1821 as the Washington Seminary, Gonzaga is named in honor of Aloysius Gonzaga, an Italian saint from the 16th century. Gonzaga is the oldest boys' high school in Washington, D.C. The Father McKenna Center, the homeless shelter on the campus of the school, makes Gonzaga the only High School in the United States with a homeless shelter on its campus.

== History ==
Gonzaga was officially founded by Fr. Anthony Kohlmann, a Jesuit, in 1821, though there is some evidence the school began a few years earlier. It is the oldest educational facility in the original federal city of Washington and was at first called Washington Seminary, operating under the charter of Georgetown College (now Georgetown University and Georgetown Preparatory School respectively), which was becoming too crowded for its space at the time. Gonzaga's original location was on land offered to the Society of Jesus by William Matthews on F Street near 10th Street, N.W., in a building adjoining Saint Patrick's Church. The purpose of this school was to train seminarians, but soon after opening, it began admitting lay students. The school was immediately popular among Catholic families and was well enough known in its early years to attract the attention of President John Quincy Adams, who visited the school to test the boys' Latin and Greek. However, there were financial problems that caused the Jesuits to withdraw in 1827: their order prohibited the charging of tuition at a day school for youth. It continued to be run by laity until the Jesuits returned some twenty years later (with the ordinance regarding tuition changed); President Zachary Taylor presided at the commencement exercises in 1849.

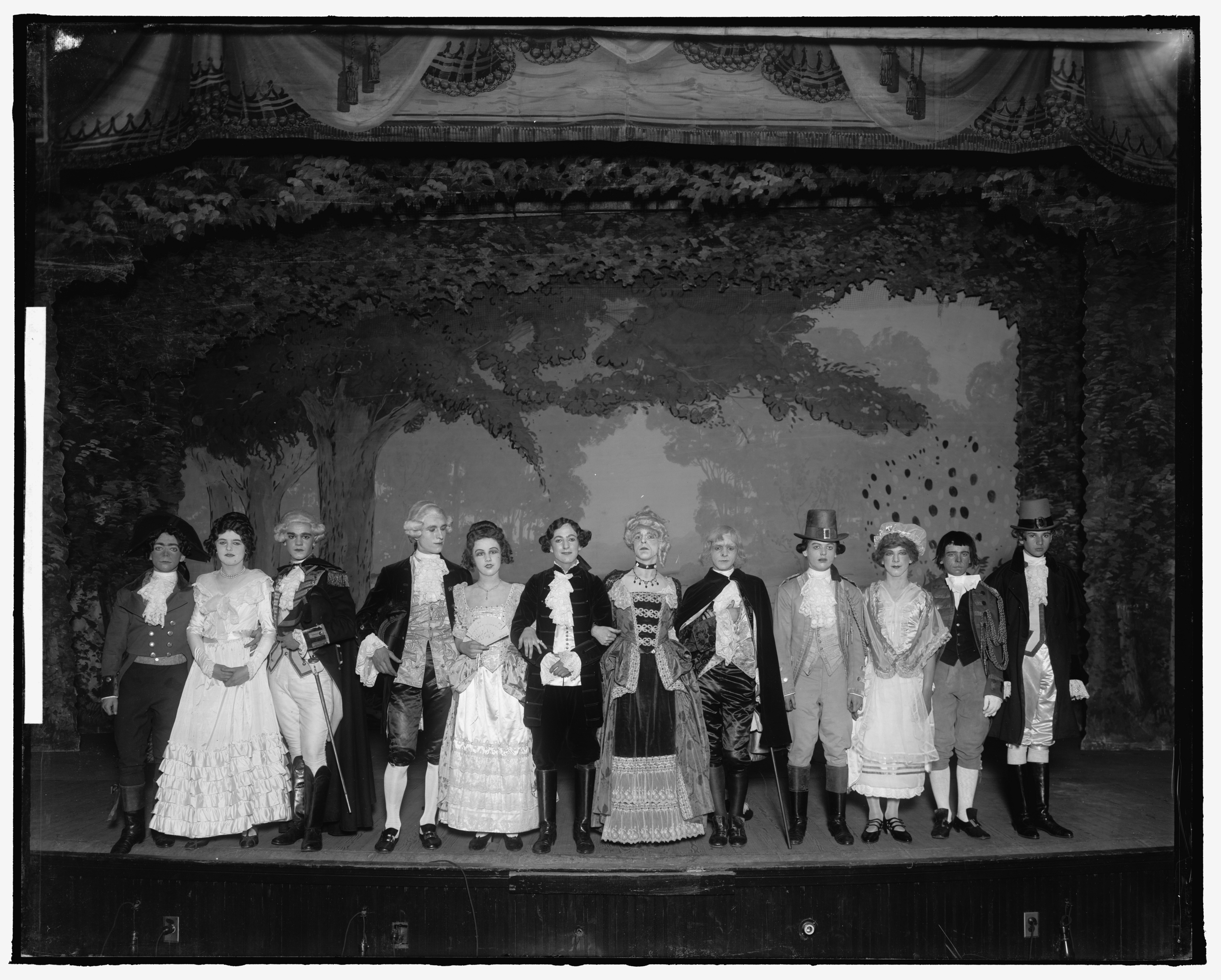
The Gonzaga Players, now the Gonzaga Dramatic Association, performing in Sheehy Theater in 1905.

In 1858, Gonzaga was granted its own charter by Congress as a college empowered to confer degrees in the arts and sciences, which accounts for its name (Gonzaga College) to this day. Although some students did receive bachelor's degrees in the 19th century, Gonzaga no longer confers degrees, other than honorary doctorates presented to commencement speakers or other notable guests. In 1871, the school moved to a building (now called Kohlmann Hall) in a neighborhood called Swampoodle located just north of the U.S. Capitol. It was located on the same block as St. Aloysius Church – built in 1859 and now on the U.S. Register of Historic Buildings, with a high Roman Catholic population surrounding it. Enrollment declined owing to the distance of the new neighborhood from the center, but the Jesuits persevered, and by the end of the 19th century the school was once again flourishing. A theater was built in 1896, and a large new classroom building (previously the Main Building and now called Dooley Hall) was opened in 1912.

John Gabriel Smith, Gonzaga's first African-American graduate, entered the school in 1951. He wanted to prepare to be a priest, and none of the schools for black children offered the necessary prerequisites, including Latin. When he decided to try out for the varsity football team, the school was unable to schedule games against public schools, which were still segregated at the time. He was ultimately prevented from playing by an injury. He graduated in 1954.

The curriculum of Gonzaga from its founding until the late 20th century was at once rigorously classical and emphatically Catholic. Mastery of Latin and deep involvement in the Catholic religion were at its core. Standards were high, and many hopeful boys who lacked the necessary qualities for success were denied admittance. To this day, Gonzaga admits approximately one third of applicants.

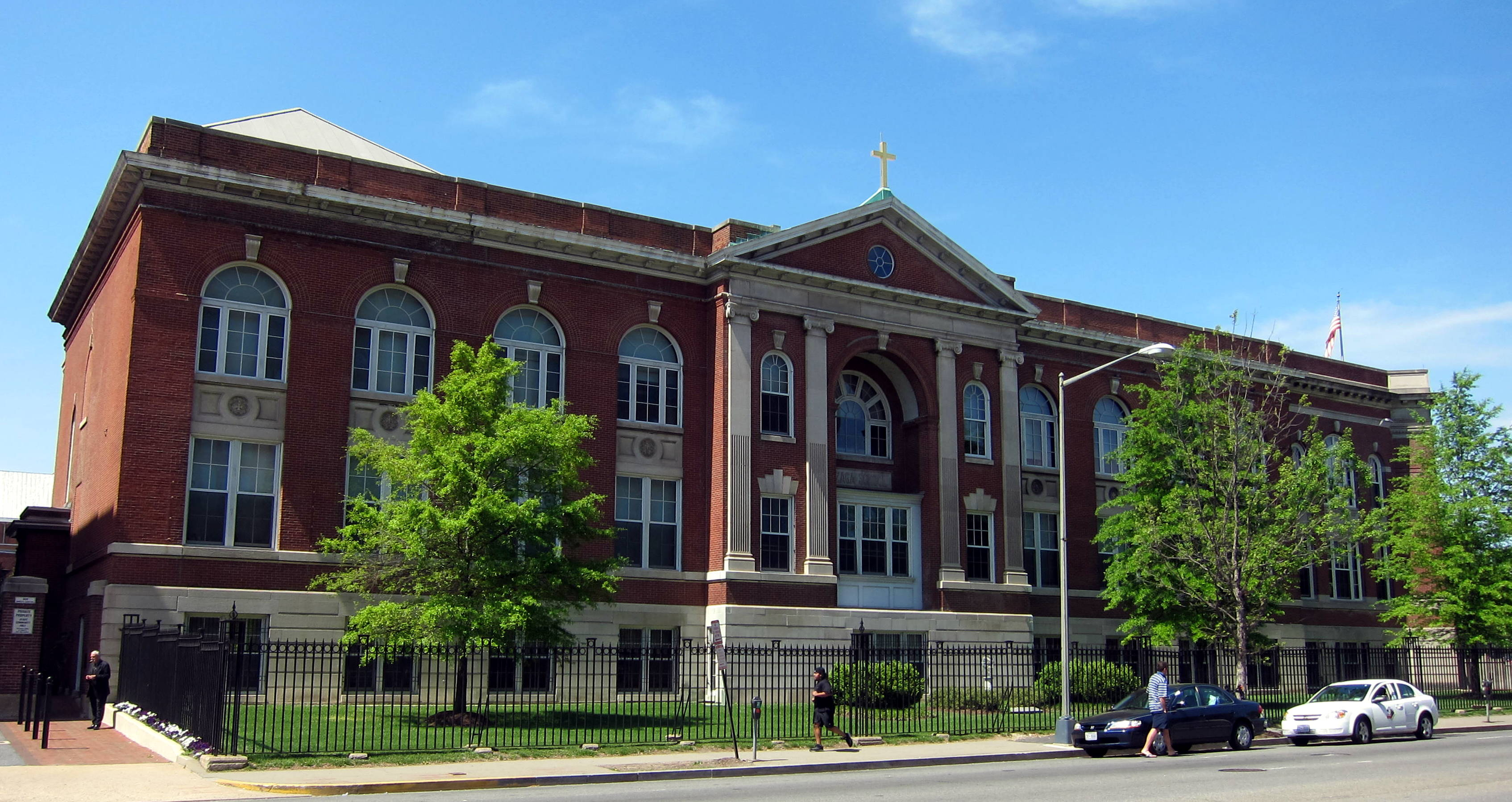
Exterior of Cantwell Hall

Gonzaga benefited greatly from the fact that the row houses built in Swampoodle were largely occupied by Irish Catholics from the late 19th century on. Although Gonzaga always drew students from other parts of the city as well, the departure of the Swampoodle Irish for the suburbs in the mid-20th century, and more especially their replacement by poorer non-Catholics, brought on another period of difficulties. A decline in enrollment and the great inner-city riot of 1968 led some to suggest that Gonzaga should be closed, or moved to a more affluent area. However, the Jesuits once again persisted and the school survived. In the last years of the 20th century Gonzaga expanded, adding several new buildings and a large playing field and field house. By 2007 Gonzaga had regained its former status and a Wall Street Journal editorial referred to it as "the premier Catholic high school of Washington." Gonzaga's acceptance rate currently stands at around 50 percent, which makes it one of the hardest schools in the Archdiocese of Washington to be accepted into.

== St. Aloysius ==
St. Aloysius is a parish church physically attached to Gonzaga through the entrance building Dooley Hall. The church was built in 1859. It is used for Masses, concerts, some school assemblies, and graduation. The large painting above the altar is the work of Constantino Brumidi, famous for painting the frescoes on the interior of the United States Capitol dome.

== Athletics ==
Gonzaga's athletic teams are called the Eagles. Gonzaga fields seventeen different varsity teams, most of which compete in the Washington Catholic Athletic Conference.

Gonzaga Ice Hockey competes in the Washington Catholic Athletic Conference (WCAC) and the Mid Atlantic Prep Hockey League (MAPHL).

Buchanan Field is the home field for football, soccer, lacrosse, rugby, and serves as a practice area for track and field. The Carmody Center hosts basketball and select wrestling matches. Old Gym is the wrestling home match site. The Fort Dupont Ice Arena hosts ice hockey games. The game and practice venue for baseball is located at the Washington Nationals Youth Academy.

=== Rivalries ===
Gonzaga's historic and biggest rival is St. John's College High School. Located in the Chevy Chase region of the city, Gonzaga vs. St. John's is a highly anticipated game in Washington, DC. The game was ranked the 15th best High School football rivalry in the United States by Sports Illustrated. The first game of the rivalry was played in 1893, however, the schools did not start regularly meeting until 1923, where the two teams travelled to Georgetown University, where Gonzaga routed St. John's 47-0 in front of a crowd of 2,500 spectators. For 51 years, between 1928 and 1978, the game was played every fall without interruption, resulting in 53 games, including 2 playoff games. For two years in 1979 and 1980, the game was not played for the first time in half a century. However, after a two year interruption, the teams continued to meet yearly. Since the abrupt stop in play, the game has been played 45 times, including playoffs. As of September 2026, the total record of the game is tied, with both teams having won 50 of the 105 games played since 1923, including 5 ties. Gonzaga's lesser rival is Georgetown Preparatory School, as they are both Jesuit institutions. They annually compete in the Jesuit Classic in football, lacrosse, and soccer.

=== Football ===
Founded in 1888, the Gonzaga football team have been playing for over 100 years. Gonzaga's football team went unbeaten in 1926, earning a 6-0 record. In 1951, the Eagles became the first school in Washington, DC to field an integrated football team. The Eagles have had several players in the NFL, most notably Chicago Bears quarterback and Heisman Trophy winner Caleb Williams. Gonzaga has won 4 WCAC championships. These victories came in 1996, 1997, 2002, and most recently, in 2018 in a game known as 45 Seconds of Madness. This iconic game was played against Dematha Catholic High School at Catholic University. This game grew notoriety for the high scoring between both teams in the final minute of the game, culminating in a gamewinning Hail Mary touchdown pass. The Hail Mary pass was featured as the top play on Sport Center Top Plays the following morning. The quarterback for that play, Caleb Williams' number 18 is retired for the Gonzaga football program.

=== Basketball ===
Gonzaga's basketball team play at the Carmody Center on Gonzaga's campus. Gonzaga have won 6 WCAC Championships, coming in 1986, 1997, 1999, 2003, 2008, 2015, 2017 and most recently, in 2019.

=== Ice Hockey ===
Gonzaga has two varsity teams, consisting of a Varsity I team and a Varsity II team. Varsity I has won 6 of the last 10 MAPHL AA Championships, winning their 10th title in 2024. Gonzaga won the WCAC Championship for the first time in 2025. The Varsity II has won four consecutive MAPHL Championships as of 2026, and have won 7 in the history of the program.

=== Lacrosse ===
The Eagles have won the WCAC Championship for lacrosse 14 times, with the most recent victory coming in 2024. The Washington Post ranked Gonzaga Lacrosse #1 in the year end rankings 5 separate times.

=== Soccer ===
The Eagles have won 15 WCAC Championships for Soccer, a conference record. Gonzaga's soccer team won 4 consecutive WCAC Championships from 2006 to 2009. As of October 2026, Gonzaga are the reigning WCAC Champions, winning 1-0 against The Heights in the Championship Game of 2025.

== Traditions and pranks ==
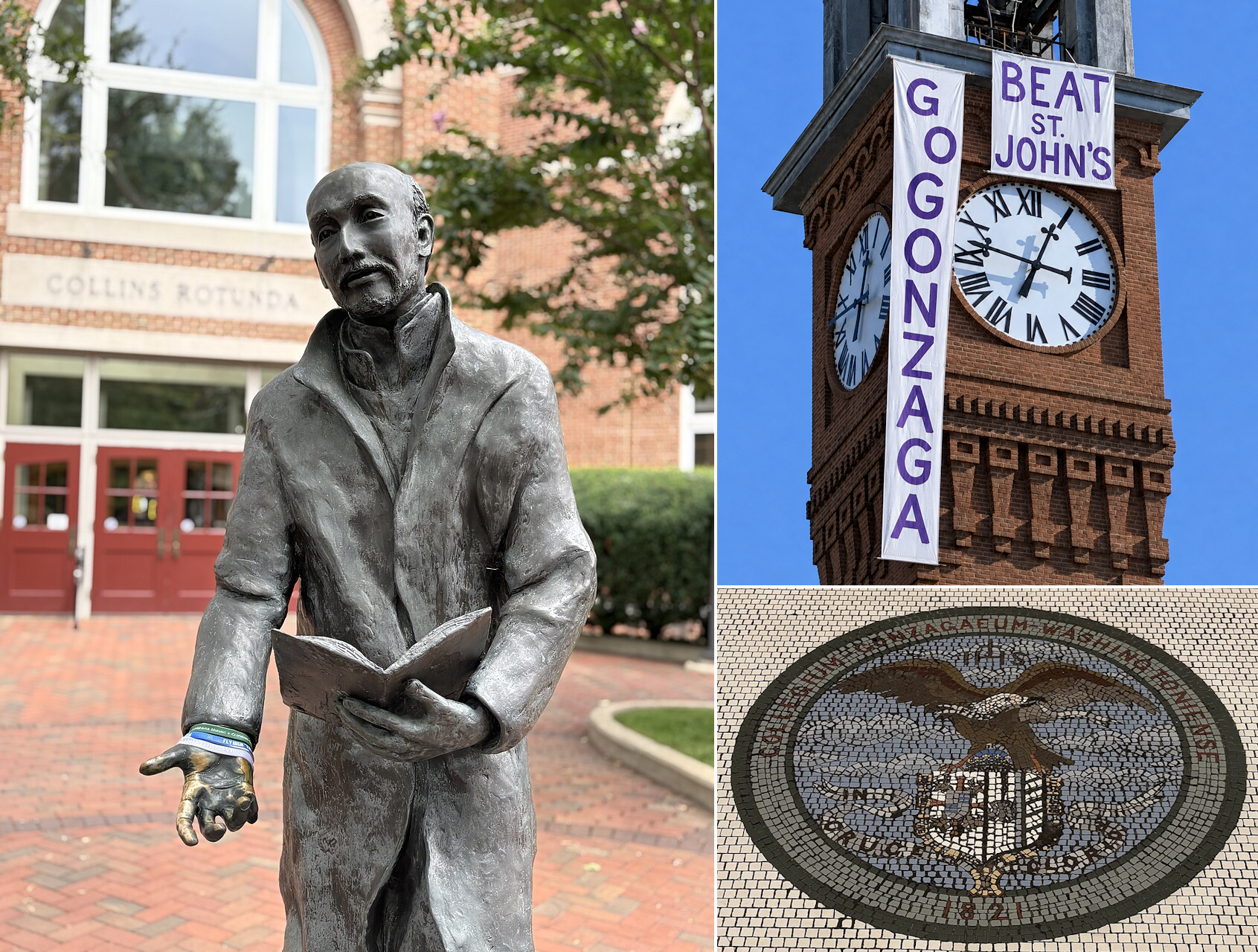
- (Clockwise from left) The statue of St. Ignatius outside the Collins Rotunda, 2 banners on the St. Al's bell tower, and the mosaic seal in Dooley Hall.
  Students do not step on a mosaic of the Gonzaga Seal, one set in the floor Dooley Hall, another in the much newer Collins Rotunda. Tradition states that students who do this will be "asked politely" by any seniors who witness the infraction to kiss the seal out of respect.
- The school's Alma Mater is sung at the end of every school mass, and after the school's sporting events.
- The Gonzaga Booster Club is a group of students who lead the student section and promote sporting events throughout the school year. Some notable alumni who were members of the Booster Club include Evan Link '23, and Carter Meadows '26.
- Annually, Gonzaga's seniors have sought some public display of urging victory of their team over rivals, usually St. John's. Such displays have included banners hung in prominent areas such on the exterior of the U.S. Capitol, and a fence in front of the Soviet Embassy. One prank occurred in 1969 where Gonzaga students used lights to turn the Washington Monument purple and white.

== List of presidents ==
No.	Name	Years	Ref.
Presidents of the Washington Seminary
1	Anthony Kohlmann SJ	1821–1824	
2	Adam Marshall SJ	1824–1825	
3	William Matthews SJ	1824–1848	
4	Jeremiah Keiley SJ	1826–1827	
5	John E. Blox SJ	1848–1851	
6	Samuel Barber SJ	1851–1854	
7	Hippolyte J. De Neckere SJ	1854–1857	
8	Burchard Villiger SJ	1857–1858	
Presidents of Gonzaga College
9	Charles H. Stonestreet SJ	1858–1860	
10	William Francis Clarke SJ	1860–1861	
11	Bernardin F. Wiget SJ	1861–1868	
12	James Clark SJ	1868–1874	
13	Charles K. Jenkins SJ	1874–1881	
14	Robert J. Fulton SJ	1881–1882	
15	John J. Murphy SJ	1882–1885	
16	Edward A. McGurk SJ	1885–1890	
17	Cornelius Gillespie SJ	1890–1898	
18	John F. Galligan SJ	1898–1899	
19	Edward X. Fink SJ	1899–1907	
20	Joseph J. Himmel SJ	1907–1908	
21	Charles W. Lyons SJ	1908–1909	
22	Eugene De L. McDonnell SJ	1909–1915	
23	Francis P. Donnelly SJ	1915–1916	
24	Paul R. Conniff SJ	1916–1922	
25	John C. Geale SJ	1922–1927	
26	Michael F. Fitzpatrick SJ	1927–1932	
27	Lawrence J. Kelly SJ	1932–1938	
28	Henri J. Wiesel SJ	1938–1944	
Presidents of Gonzaga College High School
29	Cornelius J. Gargan SJ	1944–	
	William F. Graham SJ	1965–1968	
34	Allen Paul Novotny SJ	1994–2010	
35	Joseph E. Lingan SJ	2010–2011	
36	Stephen W. Planning SJ	2011–2021	
37	Joseph E. Lingan SJ	2021–present	

== Notable faculty ==
- Joseph A. Canning, president of Loyola College in Maryland
- Rev. William F. Troy, President of Wheeling Jesuit University

== Notable alumni ==
=== Academia ===
- Thomas R. Fitzgerald, S.J., sixth president of Fairfield University and the 30th president of Saint Louis University
- Jesse Mann, emeritus of philosophy at Georgetown University
- Arthur A. O'Leary, S.J., president of Georgetown University (1935–1942)

=== Arts and entertainment ===
- Michael J. Bobbitt, playwright, director, choreographer (Class of 1990)
- David Costabile, actor (Class of 1985)
- Ryan Creamer, comedian and writer (Class of 2010)
- Owen Danoff, musician and contestant on The Voice (Class of 2007)
- Demetrius Grosse, actor (Class of 1999)
- Brian Hallisay, actor (Class of 1996)
- John Heard, actor (Class of 1964)

=== Athletes ===
- Johnson Bademosi, NFL cornerback (Class of 2008)
- Mike Banner, professional soccer player, played for SIU-Edwardsville (Class of 2002)
- Nate Britt, professional basketball player, attended but transferred before graduating.
- Robert Churchwell, NBA player for the Golden State Warriors. (Class of 1990)
- Colin Cloherty, NFL tight end (Class of 2005)
- Curome Cox, NFL safety for Denver Broncos (Class of 1999)
- Bryant Crawford, basketball player in the Israeli Basketball Premier League (Class of 2015)
- Olu Fashanu, NFL offensive tackle for the New York Jets
- A. J. Francis, NFL defensive tackle (Class of 2008)
- Billy Glading, Lacrosse All-American and midfielder for the Chesapeake Bayhawks (Major League Lacrosse) (Class of 1999)
- Ian Harkes, professional soccer player, Hermann Trophy winner (Class of 2013)
- Chuck Harris, basketball player in the German ProA
- Joey Haynos, NFL tight end for Miami Dolphins (Class of 2003)
- Darryl Hill, first African American football player at Naval Academy and in Atlantic Coast Conference (Maryland, Class of 1960)
- Kevin Hogan, NFL quarterback (Class of 2011)
- Kris Jenkins, forward for Villanova Wildcats, 2016 national champions (Class of 2013)
- Cam Johnson, NFL player for Cleveland Browns (Class of 2008)
- Malcolm Johnson, Notre Dame and NFL wide receiver
- Evan Link, Michigan offensive tackle (Class of 2023)
- Jalen McMurray, Tennessee defensive back (Class of 2021)
- Carter Meadows, Michigan defensive end (Class of 2026)
- Judah Mintz, basketball player for Basketball Bundesliga in Germany
- Nick Morabito, baseball outfielder in the New York Mets organization (Class of 2022)
- Jon Morris, NFL player for New England Patriots (Class of 1960)
- Roman Oben, NFL player for San Diego Chargers and Super Bowl champion with Tampa Bay Buccaneers (Class of 1990)
- Paul Sheehy, rugby player for USA Eagles at 1991 Rugby World Cup (Class of 1981)
- Tom Sluby, NBA player for Dallas Mavericks (Class of 1980)
- John Thompson III, basketball head coach at Georgetown University 2004-17 (Class of 1984)
- Tyler Thornton, former professional basketball player and current assistant coach for the Howard Bison
- Caleb Williams, NFL quarterback for Chicago Bears and Heisman Trophy recipient

=== Business ===
- Thomas W. Farley, president of the NYSE Group, including the New York Stock Exchange (Class of 1993)
- Jim Kimsey, co-founder of America Online, attended but dismissed and attended St. John's College High School

=== Journalism and publishing ===
- Pat Conroy, author, attended but did not graduate
- Bob Considine, journalist and author
- Joseph Ellis, Pulitzer Prize-winning author and history professor at Mount Holyoke College (Class of 1961)
- Michael Kelly, Washington Post columnist, editor of The New Republic, and editor-at-large of The Atlantic Monthly (Class of 1975)
- Lance Morrow, journalist and writer for Time magazine (Class of 1958)
- Peter Ruehl, columnist for Australian Financial Review

=== Military ===
- Brigadier General John M. K. Davis, commander of Artillery districts during the Spanish–American War (Class of 1858)
- Navy SEAL Lieutenant Commander Erik S. Kristensen who died while fighting in Afghanistan (Class of 1990)
- John M. Loh, Air Force vice chief of staff and commander of Air Combat Command, Fighter Pilot with 200 combat missions in Vietnam War (Class of 1956)
- Captain Humbert Roque "Rocky" Versace, United States, POW, Medal of Honor recipient, Pentagon Hall of Heroes inductee, Ranger Hall of Fame inductee (Class of 1955)

=== Politics and law ===
- James A. Belson, former District of Columbia judge (Class of 1949)
- William Bennett, author, radio host, former Secretary of Education, and first "drug czar" of the United States (Class of 1961)
- Don Beyer, Congressman for Virginia’s 8th congressional district, former Lieutenant Governor of Virginia, U.S. ambassador to Switzerland and Liechtenstein (Class of 1968)
- Pat Buchanan, Republican Party presidential candidate (1992, 1996), Reform Party presidential candidate (2000), author, and syndicated columnist (Class of 1956)
- Ken Cuccinelli, former Attorney General of Virginia, former Virginia State Senator, 37th District (Class of 1986)
- Lawrence Hogan, father of Governor of Maryland Larry Hogan and former United States Representative for Maryland's 5th congressional district (Class of 1946)
- Patrick N. Hogan, former member, Maryland House of Delegates (Class of 1997)
- Martin O'Malley, former Governor of Maryland and former Mayor of Baltimore (Class of 1981)
- Ben Quayle, former United States Representative for Arizona's 3rd congressional district (Class of 1994)
- William Nathaniel Roach, U.S. Senator from North Dakota
- Charles L. Schultze, former chairman, United States Council of Economic Advisers, Bronze Star recipient, Purple Heart recipient, World War II (Class of 1942)
- Steve Shannon, Virginia House of Delegates, 35th District, attended, did not graduate
- Zachary Somers, Judge, United States Court of Federal Claims (Class of 1997)
- Judge E. Gregory Wells, Appellate Court of Maryland, 2019-, Chief Judge, 2022- , Formerly a judge of the Circuit Court of Calvert County, Maryland and the District Court of Maryland. (Class of 1979).

=== Science ===
- Elliott Coues (1842-1899), physician, ornithologist, mammalogist. Coues white tail deer is named for him.
- B. Alvin Drew, United States Air Force captain, NASA astronaut (Class of 1980)
- James Pilling (1846–1895), pioneer ethnologist who compiled extensive bibliographies on Native American languages and culture

=== Others ===
- David Herold, hanged for participation in Lincoln's assassination
- Eric O'Neill, former FBI operative who played a major role in the arrest and conviction of FBI agent Robert Hanssen for spying

== See also ==
- List of Jesuit sites
