= Adam Marshall (priest) =

Catholic priest and Jesuit

The Reverend Adam Marshall

Personal details
- Born: November 18, 1785 Conewago, Pennsylvania
- Died: September 20, 1825 (aged 39) Mediterranean Sea, aboard the USS North Carolina
- Denomination: Catholic Church
- Military career
- Branch: United States Navy
- Years: 1824–1825

Adam Marshall SJ (November 18, 1785 – September 20, 1825) was an American Catholic priest and Jesuit. He briefly served as president of Washington Seminary, and later became the first Catholic chaplain in the United States Navy, albeit unofficially.

== Biography ==
Adam Marshall was born on November 18, 1785, in Conewago, Pennsylvania, to Francis Marshall and Ann Margaret Staub; he had two sisters named Margaret and Catherine. As a Jesuit priest, he first served in 1818 at St. Patrick's Church in York, Pennsylvania, and later worked in New York, the southern counties of Maryland, and at Georgetown College in Washington, D.C.

Marshall became the most significant figure in the Jesuit mission in Maryland, eventually becoming the Procurator of the Corporation of Roman Catholic Clergymen of Maryland during the suppression of the Society of Jesus.

In 1822, he was stationed at Washington Seminary (which later became Gonzaga College High School) and was placed in charge of the finances of the Jesuit mission in Maryland. In the beginning of 1824, Marshall was appointed the second president of Washington Seminary, succeeding Anthony Kohlmann. During his presidency, the students of the Seminary partook in the first civic procession in Washington by joining in the commemoration of the Declaration of Independence on the Fourth of July of 1824. While president, Marshall also gave a speech at Georgetown College during a reception for the Marquis de Lafayette, with his students in attendance.

Marshall became ill with tuberculosis, which affected his lungs. His physicians advised that he take a reprieve from duties at the school and recommended he undertake a sea voyage. Through the intervention of Commodore John Rogers, whose two sons were students at Gonzaga, Marshall obtained a position in the United States Navy. He was succeeded as president of the school by William Matthews.

Marshall was commissioned an officer in 1824 and was assigned to the USS North Carolina, a ship of the line. His official position was schoolmaster to the midshipmen, but he unofficially doubled as chaplain to the Catholic sailors, making him the first Catholic chaplain in the United States Navy. The religious services on board were conducted by an Episcopalian minister whose sermons Marshall admired. Marshall was not permitted to say Mass. Rather, his duty was to counsel and hear confession.

The North Carolina left port in Norfolk, Virginia, on December 1, 1824, for a cruise of the Mediterranean. In the final entry of Marshall's diary, the lieutenant of the watch notes that while underway, at 2:30 a.m. on September 20, 1825, during the voyage from Naples to Gibraltar, the priest died of his disease. He was buried at sea at 10 a.m. with all hands on deck. On October 22, Commodore Rogers communicated the news to the Secretary of the Navy.

== See also ==
- United States Navy Chaplain Corps
- Roman Catholic Archdiocese for the Military Services, USA
- Jesuits in the United States

Academic offices
Preceded by Anthony Kohlmann, S.J.	2nd President of Washington Seminary; 1824	Succeeded by William Matthews
