= Oratory of San Francesco Saverio del Caravita =

Oratorio di San Francesco Saverio del Caravita
- Oratory of Saint Francis Xavier "del Caravita"
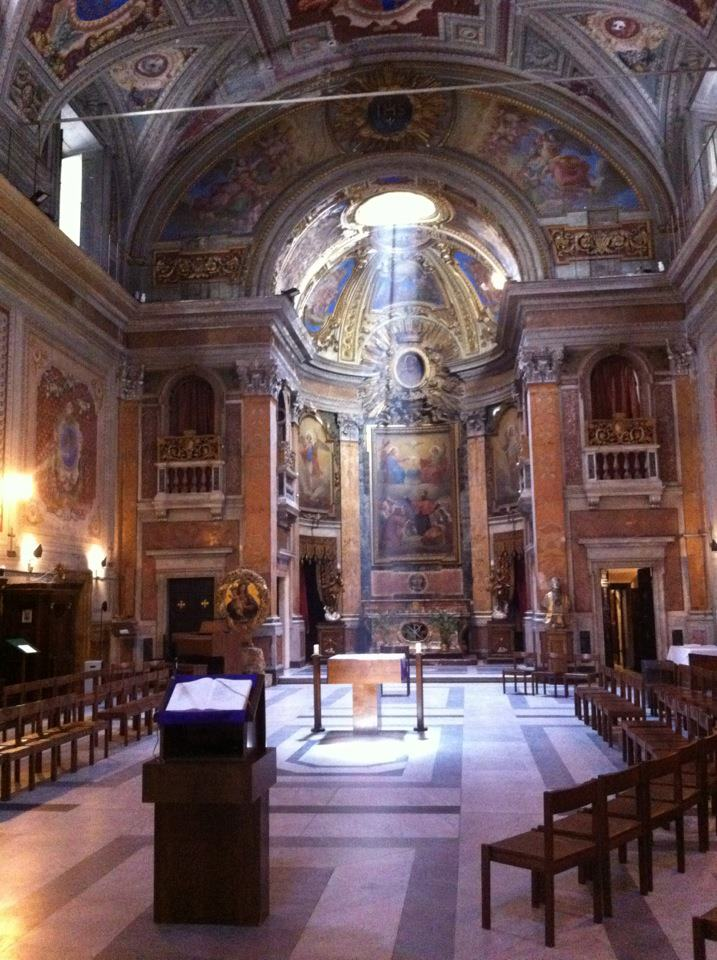
- Chairs around altar, Caravita Oratory.
- Click on the map for a fullscreen view
- 41°53′57.4″N 12°28′46.92″E
- Location: Rome
- Country: Italy
- Denomination: Catholic Church

History
- Status: Oratory (worship)
- Consecrated: 1631

Architecture
- Architect(s): Pietro Gravita, S.J.
- Architectural type: Church
- Style: Baroque/Rococo
- Groundbreaking: 1631-09-08
- Completed: 1633

The Oratory of San Francesco Saverio del Caravita (St. Francis Xavier “del Caravita”) is a 17th-century baroque oratory in Rome, near the Church of Sant’Ignazio in rione Pigna. It is home to the Caravita Community, an international English-language Catholic community in Rome.

== History ==
=== San Nicola de Forbitoribus ===
The current oratory is built over the ruins of the late twelfth century Church of San Nicola de Forbitoribus. The earliest reference to San Nicola is in the Ordo of Cencius Camerarius of 1192.

Forbitoribus apparently refers to the Confraternity of the Forbiciai – the "scissors-makers" and manufacturers of knives. It was a common practice in the 12th century for churches to be sponsored by specific guilds or artisans’ associations, such as Saint Benedict of the Kettle-Makers (de Caccabis), Saint Mary of the Blacksmiths (de Ferraris), Saint Nicholas of the Lime Burners (Calcarariorum), Saint Nicholas of the Rope Makers (Funariorum).

The Church of San Nicola is referenced in a bull of Pope Urban V (1362-1370).

On 1 September 1405, the church and bell tower were struck by lightning and suffered considerable damage.

On 14 September 1551, Pope Julius III entrusted the Church to the Camaldolese monks, who established a monastery adjacent to the church dedicated to Saint Anthony of Egypt.

By 1631, the Society of Jesus had established itself next door with the Collegio Romano, and sought to expand nearby to accommodate the active sodalities and lay congregations regularly meeting in the College. The Jesuits acquired the property from the Camaldolese in exchange for a site near Piazza Venezia. The Camaldolese relocated to Saint Romuald, and the Jesuits set about demolishing the older church and monastery in favor of a new oratory.

=== Pietro Gravita, SJ ===
The current oratory was built by the Jesuit Pietro Gravita, from 1631-1633, with the financial support of a number of noble families who resided in the neighborhood near the Pantheon. Construction was inaugurated on 8 September 1631 with the blessing of Bishop Emilio Altieri, an alumnus of the Collegio Romano and Bishop of Camerino, La Marche, from 1627-1666. Created a cardinal in 1669, Bishop Altieri was elected Pope Clement X in 1670.

The oratory was originally dedicated to Santa Maria della Pietà (Our Lady of Pity) in addition to the great Jesuit missionary Saint Francis Xavier. Under Gravita "it attracted as many os 20,000 communicants a day". It was the first nocturnal oratory in Rome.

Father Gravita was from Terni, and the difference in dialect was apparently enough that the Romans changed the pronunciation of his name to "Caravita". After his death in 1658, the oratory also became known as the oratory “of the Caravita”.

=== The lay congregations ===
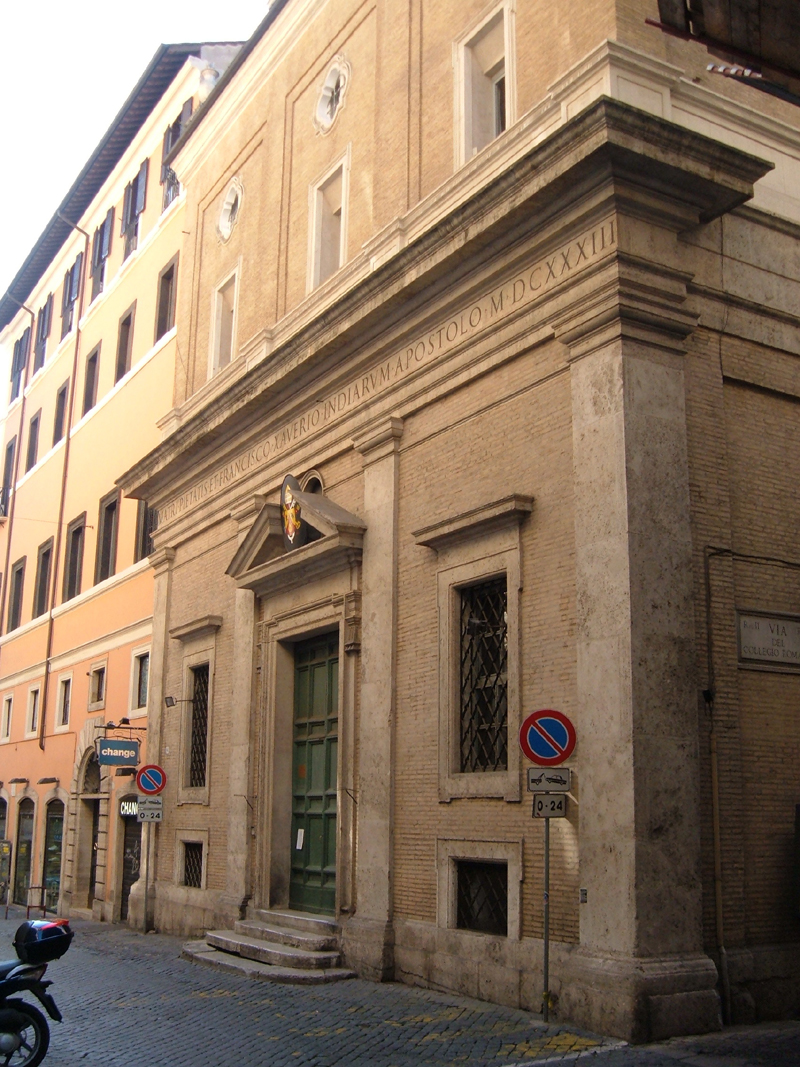

One of the first purpose of the Oratory of St. Francis Xavier was the Missione Urbana, a Jesuit outreach funded by charitable donation, focused on the evangelization and catechesis of farmers and others who came into the Roman markets from the outlying farmlands, which lacked proper pastoral care.

Soon several confraternities, sodalities, and lay congregations began to use the oratory to support their work, including the Mantelloni, a lay penitential confederacy at the Collegio Romano known for its excessive displays of self-mortification.

Another that quickly gained appeal for the students of the Collegio Romano, and which met at the Oratory del Caravita, was the Sodality of the Blessed Virgin, founded in 1563 by a Belgian Jesuit, Jean Leunis.

In 1584, Pope Gregory XIII had ratified the sodality of the Roman College as the prima primeria, or primary unit, to which all other sodalities were to be affiliated, creating a universal structure for these movements. This became a model for the relationship of the other congregations and sodalities, causing the Oratory del Caravita to become the centre of Jesuit-sponsored lay movements known as Congregazione della Santissima Communione Generale, Congregations of General Holy Communion, known for their emphasis on frequent reception of Holy Communion and Eucharistic processions.

In addition, each of these movements emphasized a deep spiritual life of meditation and examination of conscience. Many had a strong charitable orientation, and embraced a broad spectrum of the population: farmers, lawyers, artisans, students, aristocrats, and the guilds.

At the height of their activity, there were nine such organizations housed in the Caravita Oratory, including the first to open membership to women. Each had its own meeting space in the Oratory, but on Friday evenings all would come together for common devotions and formation with the Jesuits who studied or taught at the neighboring Collegio Romano.

Caravita’s mission was consistent with the pastoral strategy of the Jesuits’ founder, Saint Ignatius of Loyola. Whereas monasteries and convents of monks and nuns were in the countryside, Ignatius and the early Jesuits were in the heart of the city where, alongside the elegant palazzi of Rome’s nobility, there was suffering and need. It was here that Ignatius developed a strategic program for Jesuit ministries: hearing confessions, preaching, teaching, but also caring for the poor and victims of the plague, as well as ministering to prostitutes and steering them into houses of reformation.

In 1773, with the suppression of the Society of Jesus, the oratory was under the care of the Fathers of the Holy Faith (later called “Fathers of the Faith of Jesus”), with the help of the Vincentians. These attempted to maintain the Ignatian vision and mission strategy in the absence of the Jesuits. After the restoration of the Society in 1813, the Oratory was used as the center of activity for all Jesuit lay associations in Rome, until falling into disuse in 1925.

== Art and architecture ==
=== Architecture ===
The façade has two orders of pilasters. The second level has windows surmounted by unusual quadrilobal oval apertures and is crowned by a balustraded attic in which an iron cross is in the middle of four flamboyant travertine vases. The interior is an ideal example of Roman Jesuit architecture with its single nave preceded by an atrium, and its emphasis on visibility (clear sight lines to view the altar and Holy Eucharist) and audibility (the centrality of preaching and catechesis in Jesuit mission). This is classically seen in the Mother Church of the Jesuits, the Church of the Gesù where Baroque architecture was born, but is also seen in miniature at Caravita – an architectural plan following the same principles.

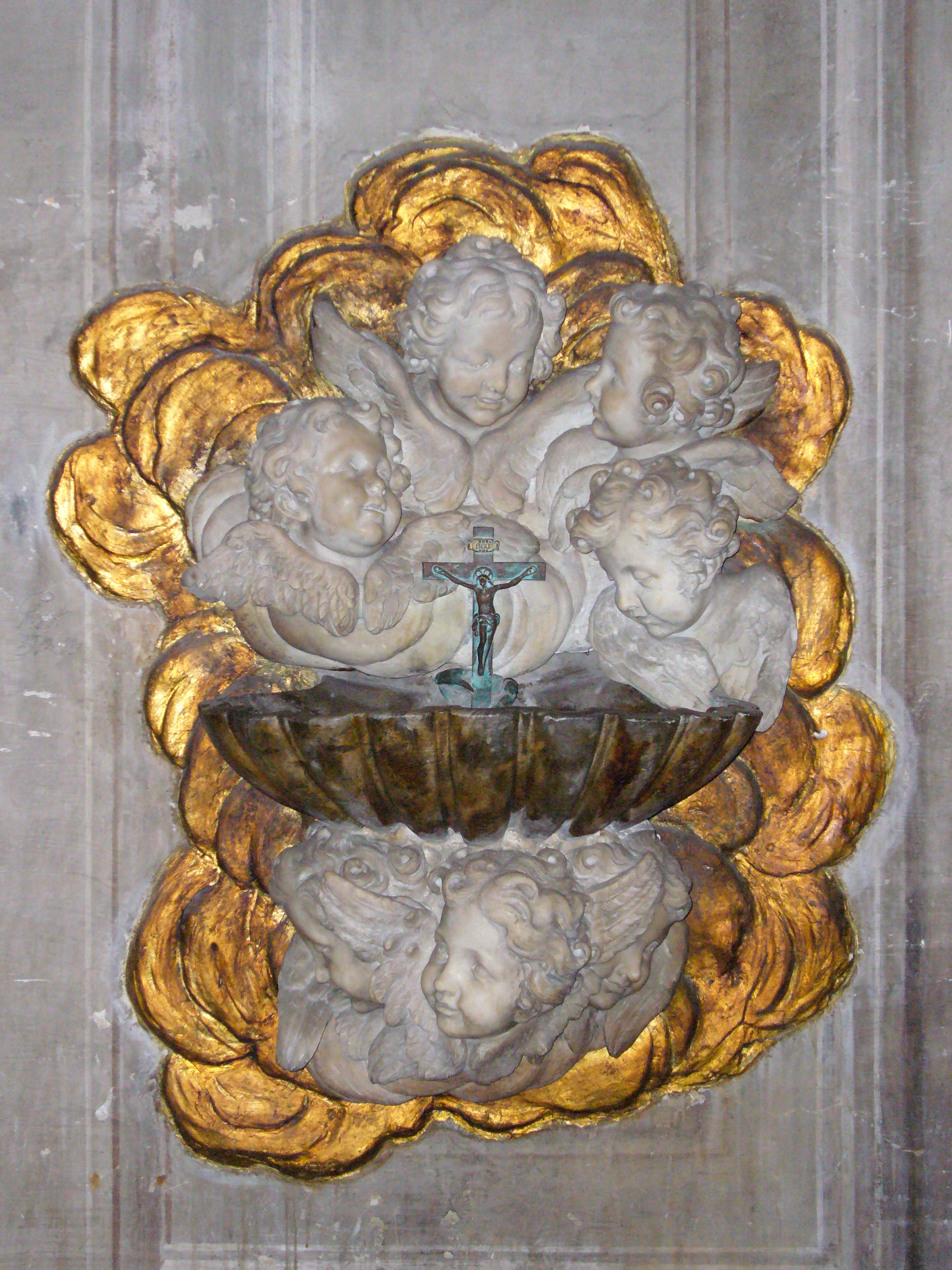

Caravita was completely rebuilt between 1670 and 1677, probably under the guidance of architect Giovanni Antonio de’Rossi, and was once again dedicated to Saint Francis Xavier, Apostle of the Indies, and the Madonna della Pietà as indicated in the inscription about the entrance on the Oratory’s façade.

Of particular interest are the seventeenth century benches along the wall which are of sculpted walnut. The two holy water fonts in the Atrium (see at left) are made in the form of a crab with the bronze crucifix in the claw – a symbol of Francis Xavier. The Oratory leads to small rooms, including the Ristretto degli Angeli above the Atrium – a room where the Sodality of the Roman College used to meet, with handsome decorations in stucco by Giovanni Battista Maini which he completed in 1745-1746. Today that room, along with several others upstairs, is occupied by the Roman choral group Il Coro del Lunedì.

In 1716, to facilitate passage of the Jesuits across the street, a skybridge was built connecting the old Roman College to Caravita, over the Via del Collegio Romano. It is known as the Arco dei Gesuiti (Arch of the Jesuits).

=== Frescoes ===
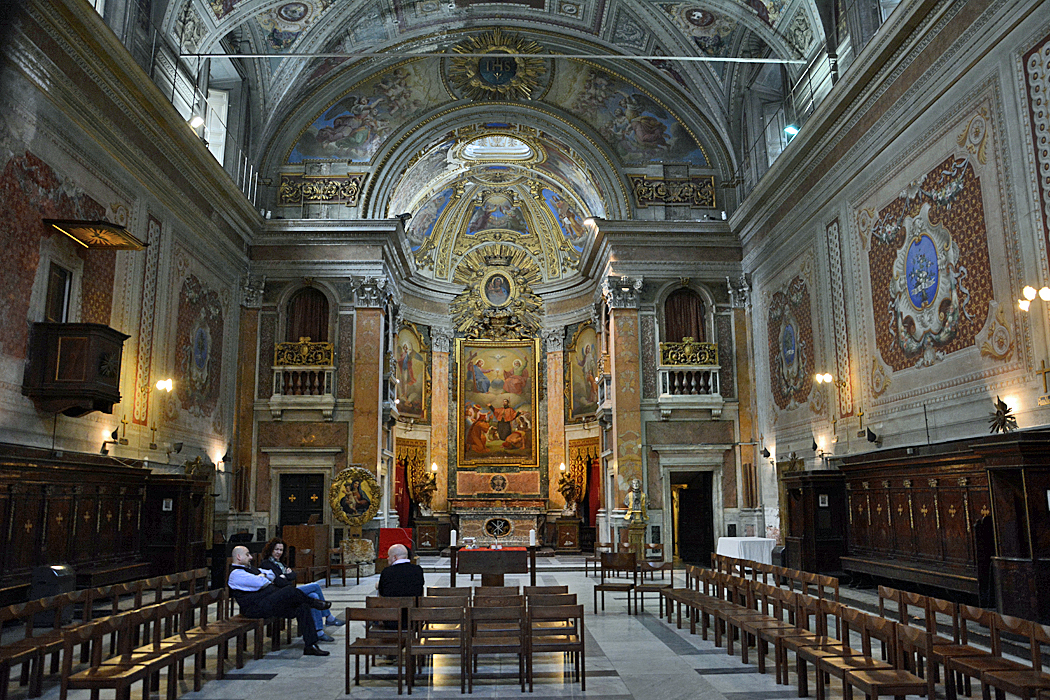

In the year 1670 as part of the restoration and in honor of the sacred image of the Mother of Mercy (Mater Pietatis), a fresco attributed to Baldassarre Peruzzi which came from the ancient Church of San Rocco all’Augusteo was donated to Caravita. In 1677 it was placed in the apse and crowned by the Vatican Chapter. Today it is found near the organ just to the left of the old sanctuary. To the right near the entrance to the sacristy, one finds a relic of Saint Francis Xavier encased in a silver reliquary.

Also conserved are the seventeenth-century frescoes depicting the Life of Saint Francis Xavier, located in the atrium and executed by various artists on a design by Lazzaro Baldi (1624-1703), while the main altarpiece dating from the eighteenth century is by Sebastiano Conca and depicts the Holy Trinity and Saint Francis Xavier.

=== Music ===
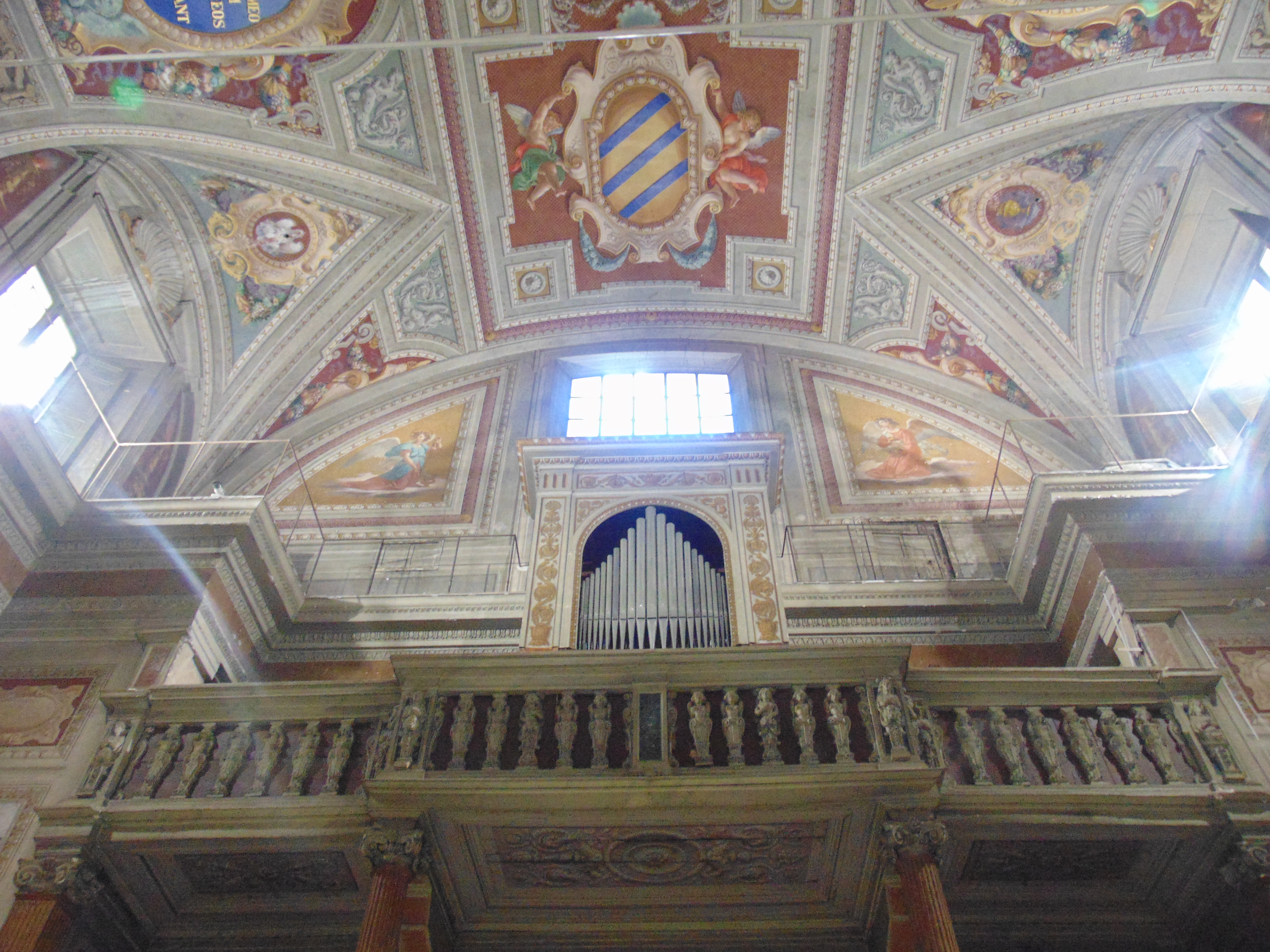

The organ located upstairs in the Gallery was built in 1790 by the distinguished Priori Family – one of the most important organ builders in Rome at the end of the eighteenth century and throughout all of the nineteenth. The organ at Caravita is defined as “pre-Romantic” – a decisively transitional instrument with respect to the Baroque organ more commonly found in Rome. It is a simple structure of only one keyboard with twenty-three keys and only eight pedals. It was renovated and tuned in 2012.

It is said that Frescobaldi may have played on that organ. Wolfgang Amadeus Mozart was a teenager when he performed at Caravita in 1770 on an earlier organ, prior to the installation of the Priori instrument. Caravita is mentioned in two ironic sonnets composed by Giuseppe Gioachino Belli: L’ineggno dell’Omo written in dialect (Romanesco) and Li frateli Mantelloni, on 18 and 19 December 1832.

=== Literature ===
- Claudio Rendina: Le Chiese di Roma. Newton & Compton Editori, Roma 2007, ISBN 978-88-541-0931-5.
- Paolo Galeotti (Hrsg.): Roma Sacra, 2 Itinerario. Elio de Rosa Editore, Pozzuoli 1995.
- Giuseppe Gioachino Belli: two sonnets.

== Caravita Community ==
=== History ===
In 2000, the Jesuits responsible for the Church of Sant’Ignazio sought to begin an English-language liturgy for pilgrims coming to Rome during the Great Jubilee Year. Rather than simply offer an English Mass near the pantheon, the community's founding members sought to revive the original mission of the Oratory for the support and development of lay formation and ministry with an Ignatian spirituality and vision for outreach from the center of Christ and the Church to the frontiers and margins.

The Caravita Community was formed, and opened the doors of the Oratory again on 15 October 2000. Since then, it has been mostly used by an international English-speaking group, mainly consisting of expatriates from around the Anglophone world, particularly the U.S., U.K., Ireland, Australia, New Zealand, Nigeria and Canada. Regular membership is composed largely of academics, leaders of religious communities, diplomats, and staff of international NGOs based in Rome.

The community has a special outreach to English-speaking pilgrims in Rome as well, so there are often as many or more visitors as locals.

=== Pastoral leadership ===
The current staff includes:

- Rev. Anthony SooHoo, SJ, professor at the Pontifical Biblical Institute of Rome
- Weekly presiders include English speaking priests assigned to Rome or visiting priests.

A Pastoral Council was founded in 2005 and includes a number of active laity and religious in Rome, among whom are theologians, leaders of religious congregations, diplomats, and veteran vaticanisti.

=== Mission and activity ===
The Caravita Community is known primarily for its commitment to hospitality for pilgrims and visitors, to quality liturgy marked by noble simplicity, and to ecumenical partnerships and outreach. It also maintains an occasional lecture series, concerts, and other musical events, and a commitment to social justice and charitable service.

On 14 April 2013, the Caravita Community entered into an Ecumenical Covenant with the Anglican Centre in Rome, directed by the Archbishop of Canterbury’s Representative to the Holy See. This covenant reflects the reality of ecumenical commitment that was inspired by the Jubilee efforts at ecclesial reconciliation that has been a part of the Community since its inception. It has served as the site of services and welcome and farewell for the representatives to the Holy See of both the Anglican Communion and the World Methodist Council since 2008, and other receptions such as that following Pope Francis' audience with the International Old Catholic Bishops' Conference in Rome in 2014. Archbishop of Canterbury Rowan Williams and Cardinal Walter Kasper presided at an ecumenical vespers on 20 November 2009. Several joint services, including the annual Ash Wednesday service of Churches Together in Rome, have taken place at Caravita, as well as "ecumenical relationships in the service of peace in war-torn parts of the world".

From February to July 2019 the oratory hosted an exhibition for the Migrants Foundation, displaying great pictorial works inspired by the theme of migration.

The oratory is also used every other week for a Spanish-language liturgy.

== See also ==
- List of Jesuit sites
