= Robert Molyneux =

English-American Jesuit (1738–1808)

The Reverend Robert Molyneux SJ
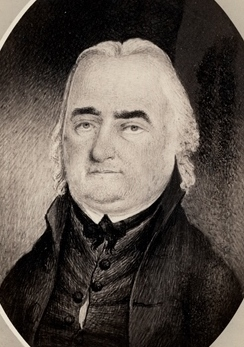

2nd & 5th President of Georgetown College
- In office 1806–1808
- Preceded by: Leonard Neale
- Succeeded by: Francis Neale
- In office 1793–1796
- Preceded by: Robert Plunkett
- Succeeded by: Louis William DuBourg

Personal details
- Born: July 24, 1738 Formby, Lancashire, England
- Died: December 9, 1808 (aged 70) Georgetown, District of Columbia, United States (Note: Georgetown was a separately chartered city within the District of Columbia until the consolidation of the district's governments into a single entity, Washington, D.C., with the Organic Act of 1871.)
- Resting place: Jesuit Community Cemetery
- Education: Colleges of St Omer and Bruges
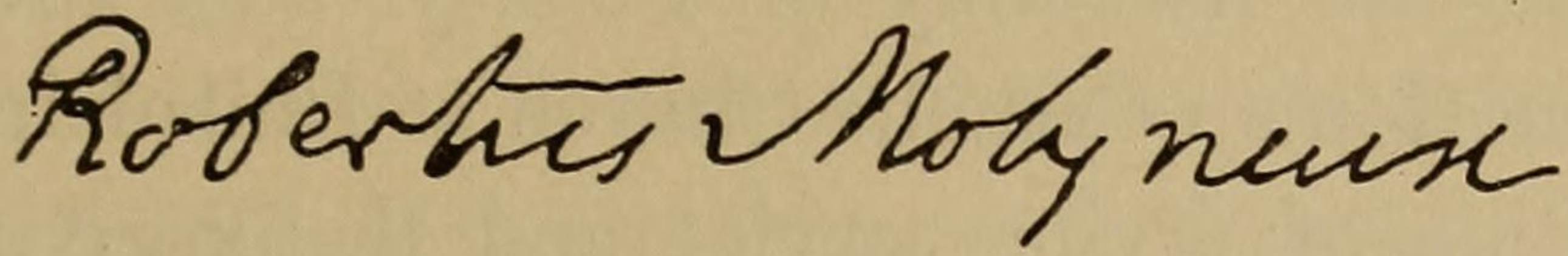
- Signature

Robert P. Molyneux SJ (July 24, 1738 – December 9, 1808) (Note: Molyneux's surname was spelled in some writings as Molyneaux or Molineaux.) was an English-American Catholic priest and Jesuit missionary to the United States. Born to a prominent English family, he entered the Society of Jesus and studied at the College of St Omer in France. When the school moved to Bruges, Belgium, he followed, becoming a master. In 1771, he emigrated to the United States as a missionary, where he took up pastoral work in Philadelphia.

He became the pastor of both Old St. Joseph's Church and Old St. Mary's Church, where he served for 16 years. During that time, he opened the first parochial school in the United States, and edited the first American catechism. His pastorate encompassed the American Revolutionary War, and though he did not expressly commit himself to either belligerent, he largely endorsed the American cause.

Molyneux then spent several years in the Jesuits' Maryland missions, and was made vicar general for Southern Maryland by the Bishop of Baltimore, John Carroll. In 1793, Carroll appointed Molyneux the second president of Georgetown College, where he oversaw the construction of the Old North building. After three years, he returned to missionary work, until 1805, when he was named the first superior of the Jesuit Maryland Mission after their restoration. He remained superior for the rest of his life, and saw the establishment of a novitiate at Georgetown, where he became president again in 1806. His term lasted two years, before he died.

== Early life ==
Coat of Arms of Robert Molyneux

Robert P. Molyneux was born July 24, 1738, in Formby, Lancashire, England, into a prominent, Cavalier family. Due to the Penal Laws, he was tutored privately at home, before entering the Society of Jesus on September 7, 1757, following in the path of his brother, William. Molyneux then enrolled at the College of St Omer in France, and continued with the school when it relocated to Bruges, Belgium. He became a master there in 1764, and had as one of his students John Carroll, the future Archbishop of Baltimore.

Though he was ordained a priest, Molyneux had not yet pronounced his final vows when he went to the United States as a missionary. He arrived in Maryland in 1771, where he worked in the Jesuits' Maryland Mission. His ancestor, Richard Molyneux, had previously been a Jesuit who worked in the Maryland Mission. The Bishop of Maryland, John Carroll, sought to appoint Molyneux his coadjutor bishop, but Molyneux declined the post.

== Missionary in America ==
Molyneux was in Maryland for only a short while before he went to Philadelphia on March 21, 1771. When the pastor of Old St. Joseph's Church, Robert Harding, died in 1771, John Lewis was appointed to succeed him; however, Lewis very shortly thereafter left for Maryland. In his place, Molyneux was named pastor of Old St. Joseph's in September 1772, as well as of Old St. Mary's Church. He had as his assistant Ferdinand Farmer, who ministered primarily to the German parishioners, traveling as far as New York to do so.

=== New country and new diocese ===
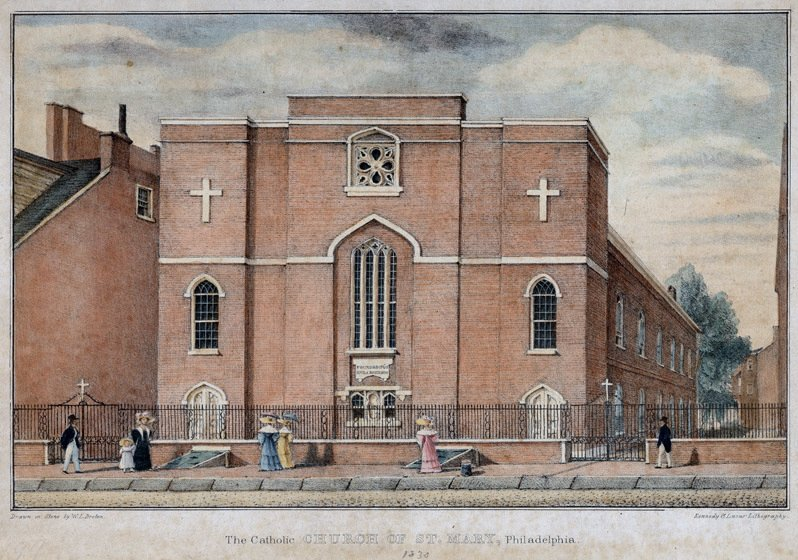
Molyneux was pastor of Old St. Mary's Church (pictured) and Old St. Joseph's Church for 16 years

In 1773, Pope Clement XIV ordered the worldwide suppression of the Jesuit order. At the time, there were 20 Jesuits working in the United States. With the outbreak of the American Revolutionary War in 1775, Molyneux adopted a personal policies described as general neutrality, as well as moderate patriotism. Nonetheless, he aligned his parish with the Americans in the war of independence. Four members of the Continental Congress, including George Washington and John Adams, visited Old St. Joseph's during the war, and Molyneux celebrated the requiem masses for a French officer who drowned in the Schuylkill River and the Spanish ambassador. He also presided over the funeral of the Spaniard Juan de Miralles. He celebrated masses to mark the anniversary of American Independence, beginning in 1779. Molyneux took the oath of allegiance to the State of Pennsylvania, and in 1783, signed a petition to have Congress return to Philadelphia. In 1782, Molyneux established the first parochial school in the United States, which would later go on to become St. Mary's Interparochial School.

Molyneux supported the establishment of a Catholic episcopal hierarchy in the United States, so that it would be separate from the ecclesiastical jurisdiction of the English bishops. Therefore, he encouraged John Carroll to accept the position of Prefect Apostolic of the United States, to which Carroll was appointed by the Sacred Congregation de Propaganda Fide in 1784. Molyneux then joined others in writing to Rome to request the elevation of the apostolic prefecture to the rank of diocese and the installation of an American bishop. Pope Pius VI consented, and Carroll became the first Bishop of Baltimore in 1789.

While pastor, Molyneux published two catechisms, one in 1785 and another 1788, making him, so far as is known, the first American to edit a catechism. He also gained a reputation as an eloquent preacher. He Molyneux tutored Anne-César de La Luzerne, the French minister plenipotentiary to the United States, in English. From 1786 to 1788, Molyneux served as a trustee of the University of the State of Pennsylvania by virtue of being the most senior Catholic cleric in Philadelphia. He also became a member of the American Philosophical Society.

His pastorate of the two churches came to an end in February 1788, and he was succeeded by Dominic Lawrence Graessel. Molyneux then left Philadelphia for the Jesuits' Maryland missions, first going to Bohemia Manor. John Carroll then appointed him the vicar general for the southern district of the diocese, and he was stationed at Newtown Manor.

== President of Georgetown College ==
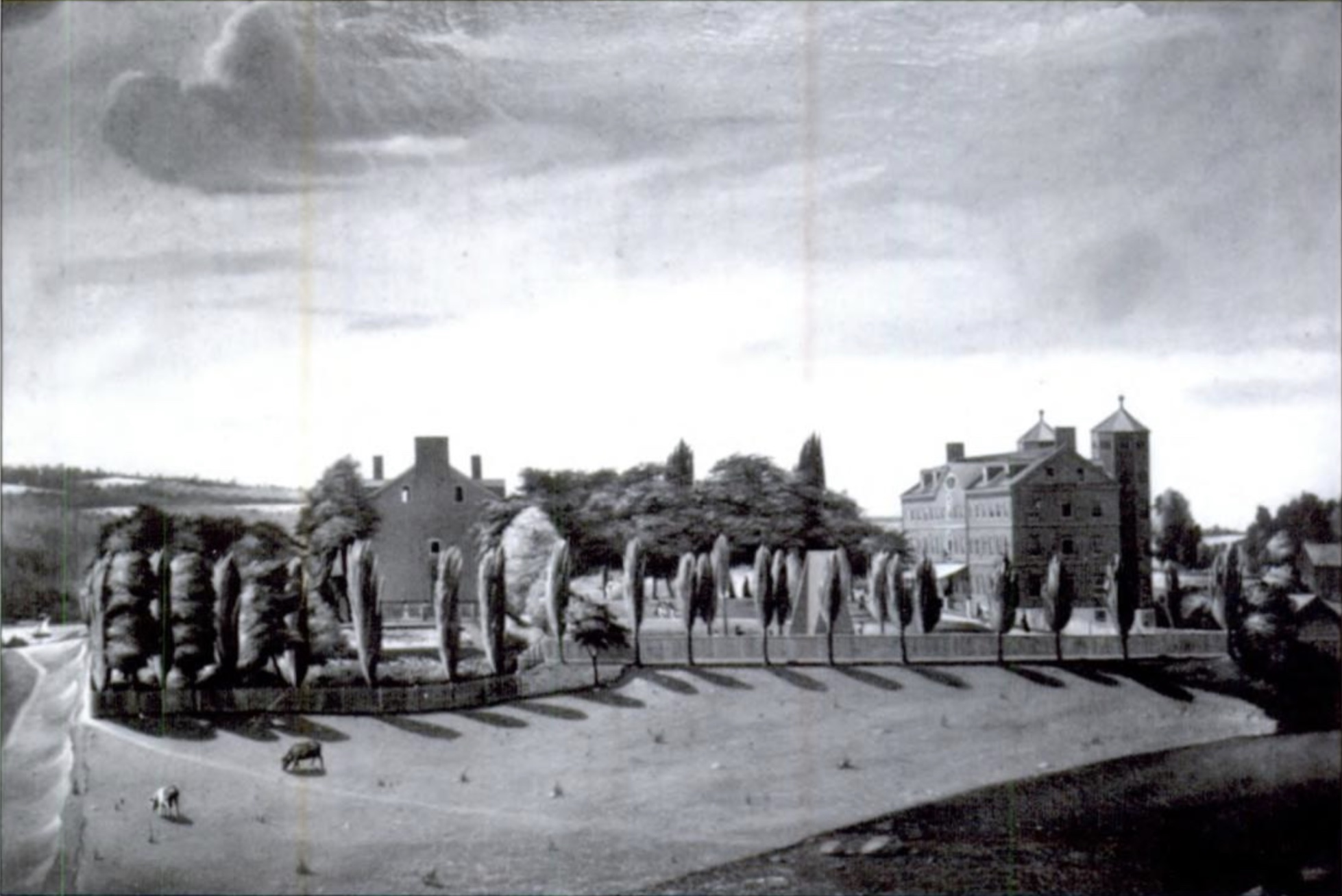
Early depiction of Old North (right) and Old South (left)

Molyneux became the second president of Georgetown University on June 14, 1793, succeeding Robert Plunkett. John Carroll had previously sought to appoint him as the school's first president, but Molyneux declined. Molyneux immediately undertook a project to expand the college, purchasing two acres (0.81 hectares) of land, located to the north of the original Old South building. This provided room for a second building as well as space for recreation for the students. Construction on the Old North building, which was modeled after Nassau Hall at Princeton University, began in 1794. Funding for construction of the building was unsteady, as the school was unable to raise adequate money through donations by Maryland Catholics. As a result, a Jesuit estate on Double Pipe Creek was sold to pay for the building, and beef was also offered as barter.

After delays resulting from this insecurity in funding, Old North opened in spring 1797. To support the increasing enrollment, the building quintupled the dormitory space on campus, and housed a chapel and several classrooms. Compared to the small structures and simple architecture of the city at the time, Old North was monumental, and was described as one of the "grandest works in Washington, after the Capitol Building." In late 1796, Molyneux submitted his resignation to John Carroll because of his declining health; Louis William DuBourg was named as his successor in October of that year. Upon leaving office, Molyneux returned to Newtown Manor for two years.

== Superior of the Maryland Jesuits ==
When Pius VII was elected pope, Emperor Paul I of Russia requested the formal restoration of the Jesuit order. In response, the pope issued the bull Catholicæ Fidei on March 7, 1801, which officially permitted the Society of Jesus to continue existing in the Russian Empire. In turn, the members of the Jesuits' former English province sought the pope's permission to be received back into the Society, as members of the Russian province. They pope gave them verbal approval and expressed his desire for the worldwide restoration of the Jesuits, but did not commit this to writing, as the political enemies of the Society remained powerful.

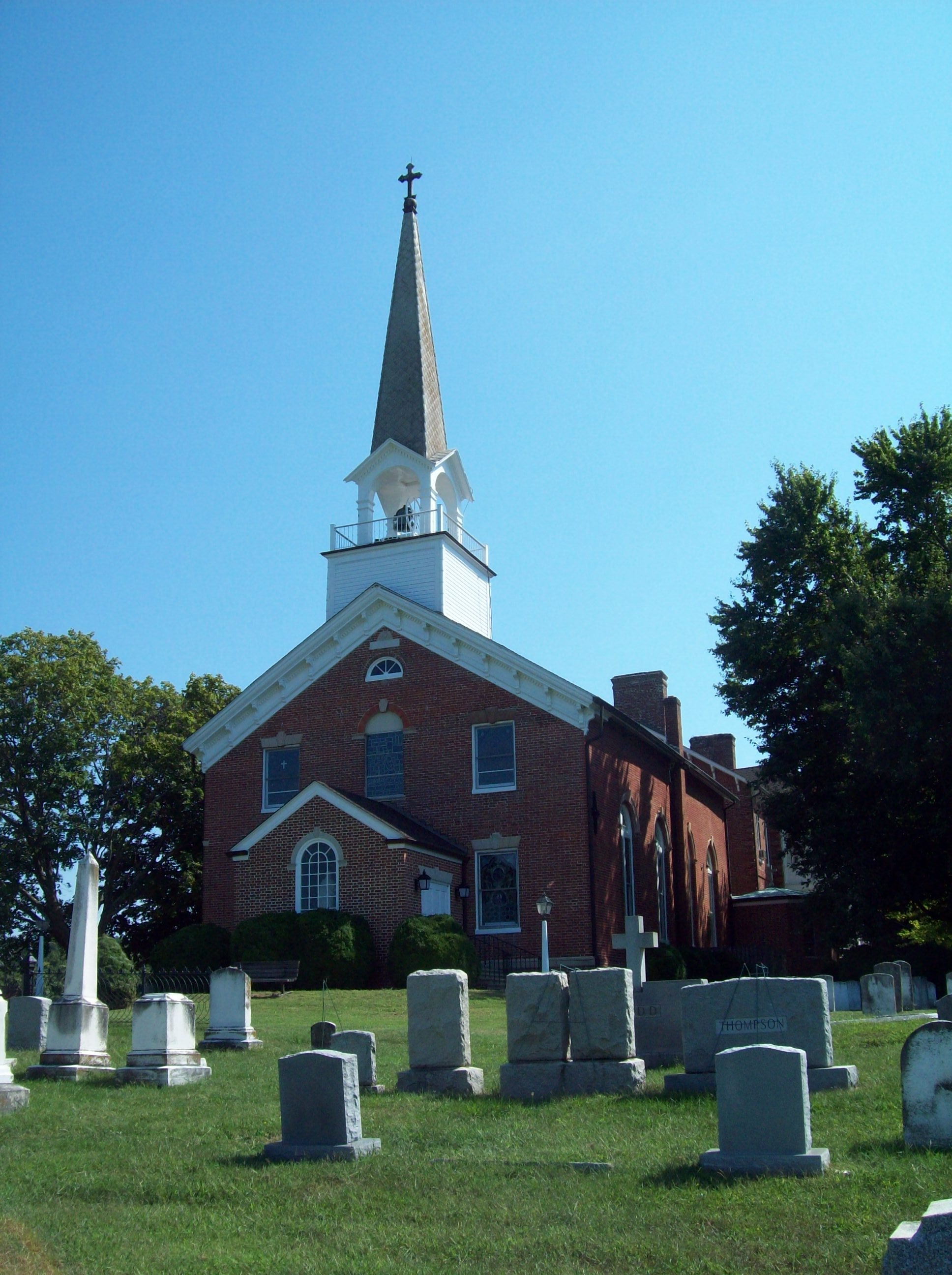
While superior of the Jesuits, Molyneux lived at St. Thomas Manor.

Seeing these developments, Bishop Carroll instructed his coadjutor, Leonard Neale, (both former Jesuits) to write Gabriel Gruber, the Jesuit Superior General, to request permission for the Maryland Jesuits to join with the Russian province. Gruber responded that he believed that the pope's oraculum vivæ vocis approbation of the Jesuits in Russia authorized him to quietly admit Jesuits from anywhere in the world to the Russian province. However, Bishop Carroll was wary that the papal permission was addressed only to Russia and was not memorialized in writing, which would allow a future pope who was hostile to the Jesuits to declare the American Jesuits insubordinate to the order of suppression. Therefore, he convened all the former Jesuits at St. Thomas Manor, and instructed them that they must each individually choose whether they would accept the risk of re-joining the Society.

All the Jesuits elected to join the Russian province, and Carroll appointed Molyneux superior of the Jesuits' Maryland Mission on June 21, 1805, with the powers of provincial superior over the Jesuits in the United States. As the first American superior of the restored Society, he resumed the position last held by John Lewis. As superior, he took up residence at St. Thomas Manor. One of his first actions was to oversee the establishment of a Jesuit novitiate at Georgetown on October 10, 1806, and a scholasticate two years after that. Five Jesuits from the Russian province were sent to Maryland to work and teach at Georgetown.

=== Second presidency of Georgetown ===
In addition to his duties as superior, Molyneux again resumed the presidency of Georgetown on October 1, 1806, replacing Bishop Leonard Neale. In so doing, Georgetown College officially became a Jesuit institution. By this time, St. Mary's Seminary and College in Baltimore, the second Catholic college in the United States, had grown and was competing with Georgetown for students. Molyneux saw that progress continued on Old North, which, though structurally complete, remained unfinished in the interior; only its third floor was able to be used. Lacking funds, the Jesuits themselves assisted the plasterer, such as by making mortar. Though the enrollment remained low, progress on the college's facilities improved the public's perception of the school.

Molyneux's health began to fail, and he exhibited dropsy. He resigned the presidency, and shortly thereafter, died at Georgetown College on December 9, 1808. He had appointed Charles Neale to succeed him as superior of the Jesuits; Francis Neale became acting president of the college until William Matthews' appointment. He is buried in the Jesuit Community Cemetery at the college. Upon his death, John Carroll recounted Molyneux as his "oldest friend" after his childhood friend Charles Carroll of Carrollton.

Saint Joseph's University in Philadelphia created the Molyneux-Lilly Award, named for Robert Molyneux and Thomas Lilly, both Jesuits. The annual award is given to an educator in Philadelphia's Catholic schools.

== Notes ==
Catholic Church titles
Preceded by John Lewis	4th Pastor of Old St. Joseph's Church; 1772—1788	Succeeded by Dominic Lawrence Graessel
Preceded by John Lewis	Pastor of Old St. Mary's Church; 1772—1788	Succeeded by Dominic Lawrence Graessel
Preceded by John Lewis	21st Superior of the Jesuit Maryland Mission; 1805—1808	Succeeded by Charles Neale
Academic offices
Preceded by Robert Plunkett	2nd President of Georgetown College; 1793—1796	Succeeded by Louis William Dubourg
Preceded by Leonard Neale	5th President of Georgetown College; 1806—1808	Succeeded by Francis Neale
