= Mount Carmel Monastery =

Historic monastery in Maryland, United States

- Mt. Carmel Monastery
- U.S. National Register of Historic Places
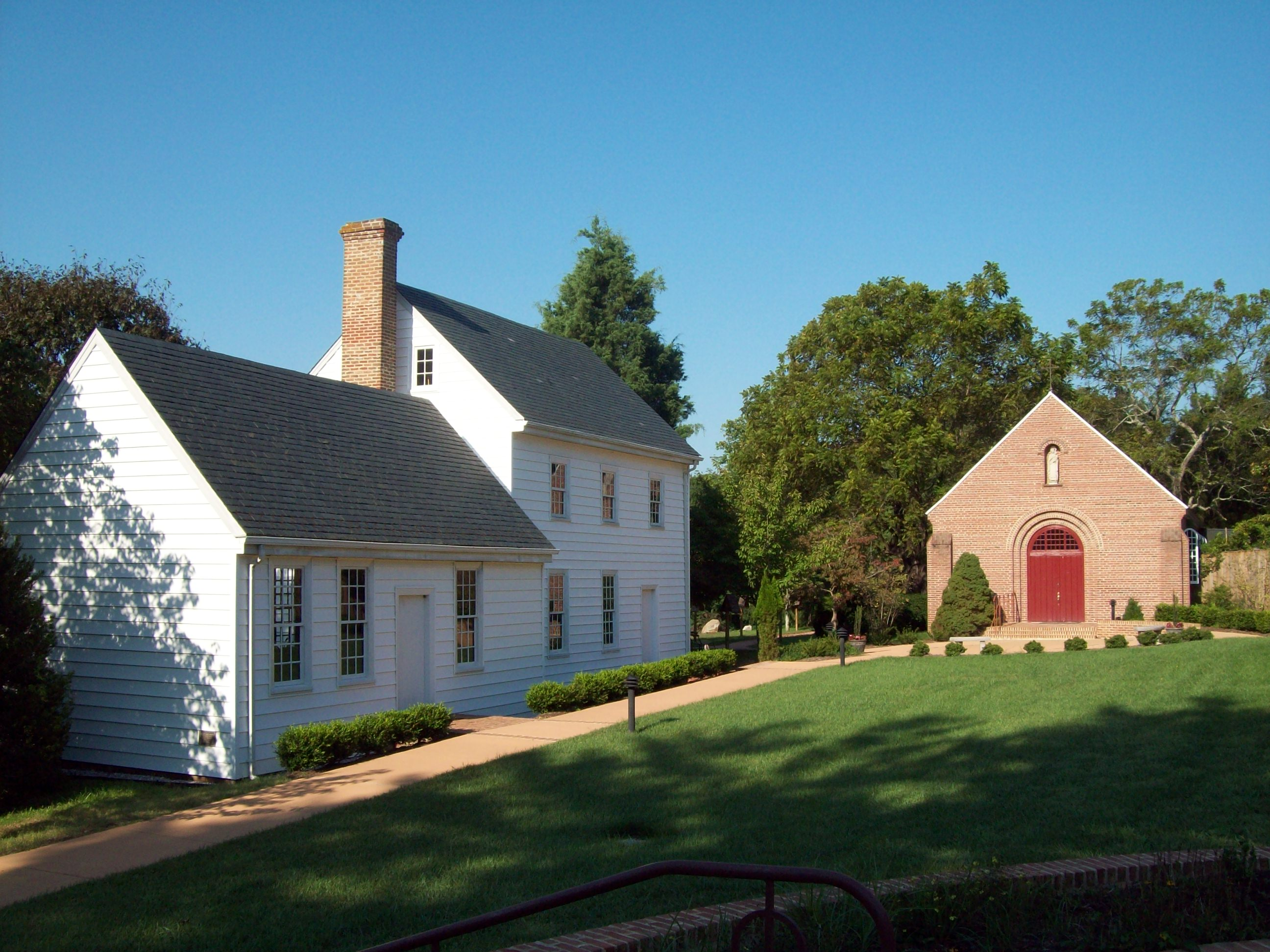
- Mt. Carmel Monastery and Chapel, September 2009

- Location within Maryland Location within the United States
- Location: North of Port Tobacco on Mt. Carmel Rd., Port Tobacco, Maryland
- Coordinates: 38°33′21″N 77°0′1″W
- Built: 1790
- Architect: Philip Hubert Frohman
- NRHP reference No.: 73000913
- Added to NRHP: December 4, 1973

The Mt. Carmel Monastery is a historic monastery located in Port Tobacco, Charles County, Maryland, United States. It comprises a two-part frame house, with the main block constructed around 1790 and restored in 1936–37. It features a two-story structure with a moderately pitched gable roof. The house's design, devoid of any extraneous ornamentation, reflects the austere lifestyle of the Carmelite nuns who are believed to have used it as their residence.

The monastery was founded on October 15, 1790, by four English-speaking Carmelite nuns from what is now Belgium, including Ann Teresa Mathews. Three of the nuns were born in Charles County, while the fourth, Frances Dickinson, was from London. Like thousands of English Roman Catholic girls who wanted to be nuns, Dickinson had traveled to Belgium to enter a convent there, as none was left in England. She served as the first prioress until her death in 1830.

In 1831, the nuns then in residence were ordered by the bishop to transfer the convent to Baltimore, Maryland. This property in Port Tobacco was abandoned. In 1933 an organization called the Restorers of Mt. Carmel in Maryland formed to aid in the restoration of the site.

The Mt. Carmel Monastery was listed on the National Register of Historic Places in 1973.
