= Ann Teresa Mathews =

Founded the first Roman Catholic religious order for women in the US (1732–1800)

Ann Teresa Mathews (religious name, Mother Bernardina Teresa Xavier of St. Joseph; 1732 – June 18, 1800) was a nun from Port Tobacco, Maryland who in 1790 founded the first Roman Catholic religious order for women in the United States.

In 1754, she had entered a convent of English-speaking Discalced Carmelites in modern-day Belgium and was elected prioress there twenty years later. In 1790, she was offered land in Maryland and returned to establish what became known as Mount Carmel Monastery in Port Tobacco. In the 19th century, the congregation relocated to Baltimore, Maryland.

== Biography ==
Mathews (sometimes spelled "Matthews") was born in 1732 to a Catholic family in the English Province of Maryland in their North American colonies. She was one of seven siblings. Her much younger brother William Matthews (1770-1854) later became known as a prominent Roman Catholic priest and educator in Washington, DC.

In 1754, Mathews went to Europe to join the English-speaking Discalced Carmelites in Hoogstraet in the Austrian Netherlands (modern Belgium). She joined the order on December 3, 1755, taking the name "Bernardina Teresa Xavier of St. Joseph". Nearly twenty years later, she was elected prioress of their convent on April 13, 1774.

In 1790, Catholicism was unsettled after its disestablishment in France by the Revolution there. In addition Emperor Joseph II had begun his own campaign against monastic establishments. Father Charles Neale, the chaplain at the convent, had been born and raised in Maryland. He offered farmland there in Port Tobacco, on the Eastern Shore, so that Sister Ann could build a convent.

She returned that year Maryland in the United States and proceeded to establish the convent in Charles County. It was dedicated on October 15, 1790. Set up as a convent for contemplatives, it was the first convent for Catholic women established in the United States. Mathews was its prioress until her death ten years later.

Her nieces Susanna Mathews (Sister Mary Eleanor) and Ann Mathews (Sister Mary Aloysia) had earlier followed her to the Netherlands and entered the convent in Hoogstraet. They returned with her to establish the Maryland convent. Also joining them was Frances Dickinson, who had been born and raised in London.

In 1831, the nuns were ordered by the bishop to move their congregation across the Chesapeake Bay to the larger city of Baltimore. Their historic building on the Eastern Shore, Mount Carmel Monastery, was listed on the National Register of Historic Places in 1973.
