= Charles Neale =

American Jesuit mission leader

The Reverend Charles Neale SJ

Orders
- Ordination: 1780

Personal details
- Born: 1751 Province of Maryland, British America
- Died: 1823 (aged 71–72)
- Denomination: Catholic Church
- Education: Colleges of St Omer, Bruges and Liège

Charles Neale SJ (1751–1823) was a leader of the Jesuit mission in America. Neale came from a prominent Catholic family of Maryland.

== Family ==
Charles Neale was born in Province of Maryland to a prominent family, descended from Captain James Neale, who had settled in the colony in 1642 with a royal grant of land of two thousand acres. Walleston Manor included Cobb Island, which is separated from the mainland by Neale Sound.

The family traced its origins to the noble O'Neill family of Ireland, from whom came the kings of Ulster. Among his ancestors were Roswell Neale (grandfather to Charles) and his brother, Father Bennett Neale, S.J., one of the first Jesuits in the English colony.

He was one of thirteen children born to William and Ann Brooke Neale of Chandler's Hope, the mansion of the Neale family, near Port Tobacco, Charles County, Maryland.

- William Chandler Neale S.J. (1743–1799), who left America to enter the Jesuit order in Flanders and spent his life ministering to the Catholics of England, where he died.
- Joseph, died while a Jesuit novice before they were able to complete their training.
- Roswell, died in Maryland in 1787, having been received into the Society of Jesus, after making his vows on his death-bed.
- Raphael (Ralph), the only son to marry.
- Leonard Neale S.J., (1746–1817) who also served as president of Georgetown and then became the Archbishop of Baltimore.
- Charles (1751–1823)
- Anne, became a Carmelite nun in France.
- Francis Neale S.J., (1756–1837) the president of Georgetown College
- Eleanor, married John Holmes
- Mary, married William Matthews, together the parents of William Matthews also a Jesuit and President of Georgetown College.

== Early life ==
At the age of about seven, Charles was sent to a Jesuit school in Bohemia, Cecil County where his brother Leonard was also a student. The school prepared those who could afford it to enter St. Omer's in French Flanders for their college or seminary education. In 1760, Leonard and Charles set sail for St. Omer's, accompanied by their sister Anne, who was joining the Carmelites at Lier, Belgium. When the Jesuits were expelled from France in 1764, the students relocated to Bruges.

On September 7, 1771, Charles Neale entered the same Jesuit novitiate in Ghent as his older brothers. Two years later, before he was able to take his religious vows as a Jesuit, Pope Clement XIV authorized the worldwide suppression of the Society of Jesus. Due to his poor health, Charles Neale joined other members of the suppressed Society who were continuing their seminary studies in Liege. There he was ordained around 1780. Shortly afterward, he became chaplain to an English-language community of Discalced Carmelite nuns in Antwerp. Their prioress, Mother Mary Margaret of the Angels, OCD, born Mary Brent in Maryland, was Neale's cousin through his grandmother, the wife of his grandfather, Roswell Neale.

Neale also served as confessor at the Carmel in Hoogstraten. During his ten years in Antwerp, he maintained contact with his friends and colleagues in Maryland. Through this dialogue, the nuns were encouraged to attempt a foundation in the new nation, the United States of America, which was just emerging from the American Revolution. Neale accompanied the nuns on their return voyage to Maryland. Initially, the intention was to have his cousin, Mother Mary Margaret, lead the new foundation, but she died in 1784. Instead the small community was led by Mother Bernardina Teresa Xavier of St. Joseph, OCD (born Ann Teresa Mathews), who was to serve as prioress. She was accompanied by her nieces, Sisters Mary Eleanora of St. Francis Xavier, OCD, and Mary Aloysia of the Blessed Trinity, OCD. Neale chose the final participant, Sister Clare Joseph of the Sacred Heart, OCD, an Englishwoman.

== Voyage ==
The small contingent sailed from the port of Texel on May 1, 1790, on a ship called The Brothers, commanded by one Captain MacDougal, a Scotsman.

Although the captain had advertised New York as the destination, he failed to advise the passengers that he was carrying cargo destined for the Canary Islands, which was a detour of some two thousand miles. The voyage was a difficult one, due both to the weather, and the lack of provisions, from the captain's unwillingness to provide adequate food for either the crew or passengers. Additionally, according to the account by the nuns, when they landed in Tenerife to drop off the cargo, local church authorities heard reports bandied about by the captain that the women were fleeing their monastery in order to marry the priests. Another priest on the ship, one surnamed Plunkett, went to the authorities to scotch the rumor. Nevertheless, Neale and the nuns stayed on board out of fear of being arrested by the Spanish Inquisition.

The ship finally arrived in New York on May 31. They stayed in the city for a month, sailing out on the Fourth of July, for Norfolk, Virginia, where they landed five days later. They then transferred to a sloop, for the final leg of the journey to Maryland, where they arrived on July 10. They then stayed for a week at the home of the brother of the late Mother Mary Margaret and Mr. Neale's cousin, before proceeding to Port Tobacco, St. Mary's County, the county seat, where Neale built them a house at his own expense.

== Maryland ==
After his return, Neale worked tirelessly to maintain the works of the Society from prior to the Suppression and to restore the Society of Jesus as an official Order. In 1803, the members of the Maryland Mission, consisting of the surviving former Jesuits, learned that, two years earlier, Pope Pius VII had approved the continuation of the Society in Russia, where the decree of suppression had never been implemented by the Empress Catherine the Great.

As a Russian Orthodox ruler, she had no obligation to obey a papal order, and she valued the educational works of the Jesuits in the territories she ruled, particularly Poland. Thus in May of that year, Bishop John Carroll, the sole Ordinary for the entire nation, supported by his coadjutor bishop, Leonard Neale (Charles' brother), both of whom were former members of the Society, appealed to the new Father General in Russia that the former Jesuits in the United States be re-admitted to the Society, noting that the structure of the Jesuit Mission in Maryland had remained intact from the time of the Suppression up to that date.

The Father General agreed and authorized the re-admission of the former Jesuits to the Society, appointing Father Robert Molyneux as Superior for the United States. Thus, Charles Neale was finally able to profess his vows as a Jesuit for the first time on August 18, 1805.

The following summer, he was appointed Vice Superior for Charles and St. Mary's counties. Neale made his final profession of solemn vows on November 16 of that same year at the Jesuit church in Georgetown.

Upon the death of Molyneux in 1808, Father Neale was appointed to succeed him as Superior of the American Jesuit community. At that time (as had also occurred after his taking vows), Neale was instructed by the Father General to leave the direction of the Carmel he had founded, in order that he might help staff the institutions of the Society. Carroll, who was by then the Archbishop of the nation, again prevailed upon the Jesuit superiors to leave him in the duty to which he was so committed.

In December 1821, Father Anthony Kohlmann, S.J., then superior of the Mission, was succeeded by Father Neale. At this point Neale, always in feeble health, was in his advanced years. It was to be his third time carrying out the duties of that office. At the time of his re-appointment, Father Neale was still working as chaplain and living with the community of Carmelite nuns at Port Tobacco. Father Kohlmann and Father Francis Dzierozynski, a Polish Jesuit who was newly arrived in America, went to inform Father Neale of his appointment and to bring some letters from Rome.

In light of the unsatisfactory conditions at White Marsh, Neale decided to transfer the Jesuit novitiate to St. Thomas Manor in St. Charles County, Maryland.

Father Neale died in 1823 and was buried in the graveyard of the monastery by order of Mother Clare Joseph, one of the nuns brought by him from Europe. She became prioress in 1800, and remained so until her death on March 27, 1830. The monastery moved to Baltimore in September 1831, at which time Father Neale's remains were relocated to the new location, along with those of ten nuns.
