= John E. Blox =

19th-century Jesuit priest

The Reverend John E. Blox

Orders
- Ordination: July 14, 1843 by Samuel Eccleston

Personal details
- Born: June 17, 1810 Belgium
- Died: April 27, 1860 (aged 49) Philadelphia, Pennsylvania, U.S.
- Denomination: Catholic Church

John E. Blox (June 17, 1810 – April 27, 1860) was an American Catholic priest and member of the Society of Jesus.

== Life ==
Blox was born on June 17, 1810, in Belgium and immigrated to the United States at the age of twenty-two. Upon his arrival, he entered the Jesuit novitiate at White Marsh Manor in Maryland on November 5, 1832. Following his probationary period, he was sent to study at Georgetown College. On July 4, 1843, he was ordained a priest by Archbishop Samuel Eccleston of Baltimore at Holy Trinity Church in the Georgetown section of Washington, D.C. He was made the pastor of St. Francis Xavier Church in Baltimore in 1845, where he remained until 1846. Following his pastorate, Blox was appointed the superior of St. Xavier College in Cincinnati (now Xavier University), a position he held for one year.

On October 2, 1848, Washington Seminary (later known as Gonzaga College High School) in Washington, D.C., resumed official operations after having been suppressed by the Catholic hierarchy. Blox was appointed its fourth president, and the first following its reopening, succeeding William Matthews. Immediately upon its reopening, the school saw a resurgence in the number of students seeking to enroll. On May 14, 1851, Blox delivered the eulogy of Archbishop Eccleston at the requiem mass at St. Patrick's Church. His term as president came to an end on August 15, 1851, when he was succeeded by Fr. Samuel Barber, S.J.

In 1854, Blox was appointed the pastor of St. Mary's Church in Alexandria, Virginia. In 1856, he directed the expansion of the church by adding a new altar, tabernacle, organ, and stained glass windows, and a large bell. He also oversaw the addition of the tallest belfry in Alexandria and the extension of the church by twenty feet. During his pastorate, Blox was responsible for a number of conversions to Catholicism, including George William Brent and fourteen others.

Blox was transferred to Philadelphia in 1857. There, he was made the spiritual director of the sodality of the Blessed Virgin Mary at St. John the Evangelist Church. Blox died in Philadelphia on April 27, 1860.

Catholic Church titles
New office	1st Pastor of St. Francis Xavier Church; 1845	Succeeded by George Carrell, S.J.
Preceded by George Villiger, S.J.	Pastor of St. Mary's Church; 1854—1857	Succeeded by Peter Kroes, S.J.
Academic offices
Preceded by William Matthews	4th President of Washington Seminary; 1848—1851	Succeeded by Samuel Barber, S.J.
