= Frances Dickinson (prior) =

British prioress

Mother Clare Joseph of the Heart of Jesus O.C.D.
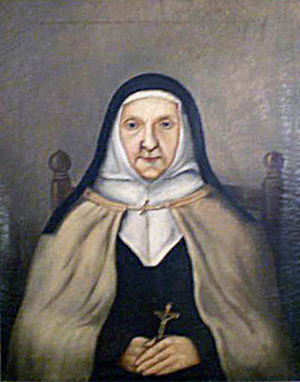
- Born: Frances Dickinson; 12 July 1755; London, England
- Died: 27 March 1830 (aged 74); Port Tobacco Village, Maryland, United States

Frances Dickinson or Clare Joseph of the Heart of Jesus (July 12, 1755 – March 27, 1830) was a British prioress at Port Tobacco Carmel, Maryland (1755–1830).

== Life ==
Dickinson was born in London in 1755. Her mother's first name is unknown but her name had been Halford before she married George Dickinson. Her family paid a £100 dowry to allow her to enter the Carmelites in Antwerp in 1772. She had been educated in Paris with the Ursulines. She professed under the religious name of "Clare Joseph of the Sacred Heart" in 1773.

The idea of having a better representation in Maryland is credited to the Carmelite prioresses Bernadine Matthews at the English Hoogstraten Carmel and Mary Margaret Brent of the English Carmelite convent at Antwerp. Brent was born in Maryland but she died in 1784. However the freedom of religion agreed in Maryland in 1776 and the peace treaties established in 1783 all encouraged the idea of establishing a new Carmel in America.

The monastery was founded on October 15, 1790, by four Carmelite nuns who had been based in Belgium. The first three were Americans they were Mary Aloysia Matthews, Mary Eleanor Matthews and their aunt Bernadine Matthews. Matthews was the heir apparent to lead the new community. The fourth nun was the English Dickinson, who like thousands of English Roman Catholic girls she had left to be a nun in Belgium. One of their first tasks was to build somewhere to live and this building is still extant.

Dickinson would be the first prioress.

== Death and legacy ==
Dickinson died in Port Tobacco Village in 1830. She was the first and last prioress at Port Tobacco. The following year the nuns abandoned the property because they were ordered to move to the larger city of Baltimore, across the Chesapeake Bay. The nuns' building in Port Tobacco, Mount Carmel Monastery, was listed on the National Register of Historic Places in 1973.
