= Francis Neale =

American Jesuit priest (1756–1837)

The Reverend Francis Neale SJ
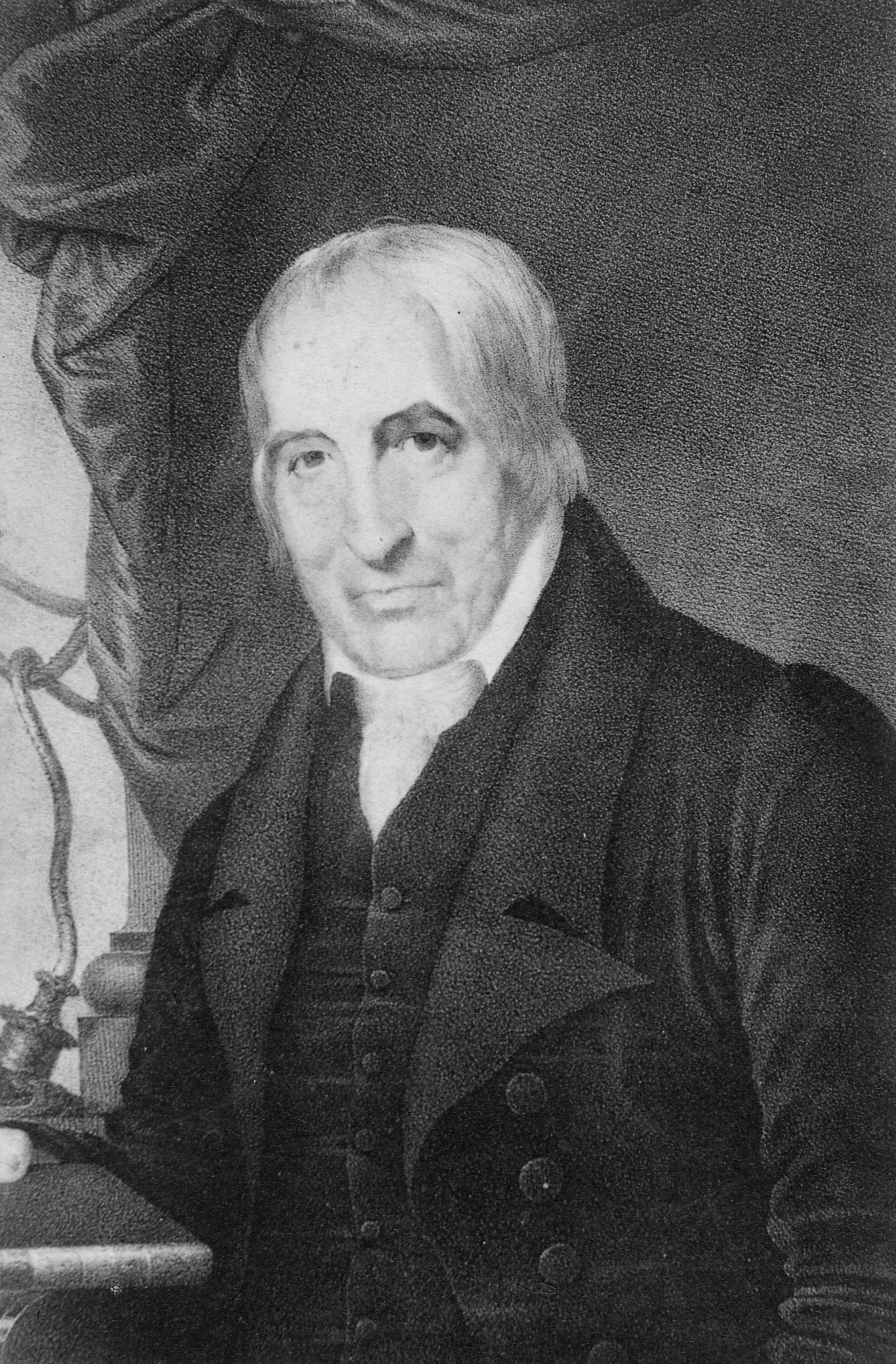

6th & 8th President of Georgetown College
- In office 1808–1809
- Preceded by: Robert Molyneux
- Succeeded by: William Matthews
- In office 1809–1812
- Preceded by: William Matthews
- Succeeded by: Giovanni Antonio Grassi

Personal details
- Born: Francis Ignatius Neale; June 3, 1756 Port Tobacco, Province of Maryland, British America
- Died: December 20, 1837 (aged 81) St. Thomas Manor, Maryland, U.S.
- Resting place: St. Thomas Manor
- Relations: Leonard Neale (brother); Charles Neale (brother)
- Education: Colleges of Bruges and Liège

Orders
- Ordination: April 3, 1788

Francis Ignatius Neale SJ (June 3, 1756 – December 20, 1837), also known as Francis Xavier Neale, was an American Catholic priest and Jesuit who led several academic and religious institutions in Washington, D.C., and Maryland. He played a substantial role in the Jesuit order's resurgence in the United States.

Born to a prominent Maryland family, Neale was educated at the Colleges of Bruges and Liège, where he was ordained a priest. When Neale returned to the United States in 1788, he became the pastor of the church at St. Thomas Manor, where he aligned himself with the rural clergy in opposing Bishop John Carroll's founding of Georgetown College, believing it would draw resources away from the Jesuits' rural manors. He would conflict with Carroll over various issues for much of his life.

In 1790, Neale oversaw the establishment of the first Catholic church in Washington, D.C., Holy Trinity Church, of which he was pastor for 27 years. He also established the Church of St. Mary in Alexandria, Virginia, and was its visiting pastor. Neale was briefly the acting president of Georgetown College, and later became its president in 1809. His tenure was considered unsuccessful, as the number of students declined dramatically due to his implementation of strict monastic discipline.

When the Jesuit order was restored in the United States in 1806, Neale joined the Society and became the master of novices at Georgetown. He was also made treasurer of the Jesuits' Maryland mission. He spent his later years as the spiritual director to the nuns at the Georgetown Visitation Monastery and the pastor at St. Thomas Manor.

== Early life ==
Francis Ignatius Neale was born on June 3, 1756, at Chandler's Hope, the Neale family estate near Port Tobacco, located in Charles County of the British Province of Maryland. He was born into a prominent Maryland family; among his ancestors was Captain James Neale, one of the settlers of the Maryland Colony, who arrived in 1637 upon receiving a royal grant of 2,000 acres (810 hectares) in what would become Port Tobacco.

Neale's parents, William Neale and Anne Neale (née Brooke), had thirteen children, and all seven of the boys, including Francis, the youngest, were sent to the Colleges of St Omer, Bruges, and Liège. Two of Francis Neale's brothers died during their studies, and four of the surviving five became Catholic priests. One brother, Leonard, would go on to become president of Georgetown College and the Archbishop of Baltimore, and another, Charles, also became a prominent Jesuit. One sister, Anne, entered the Order of Poor Clares as a nun, in Aire-sur-la-Lys, France. William Matthews, Neale's nephew through his sister Mary, was another future president of Georgetown.

In 1773, Pope Clement XIV ordered the worldwide suppression of the Society of Jesus. This meant Neale was unable to enter the Jesuit order as he intended, but he continued his seminary studies at the college in Liège. Following his ordination as a priest on April 3, 1788, he immediately left for the United States.

== Maryland missions ==
In 1789, John Carroll, the Bishop of Baltimore, founded the long-planned Georgetown College in the District of Columbia, the first Catholic institution of higher education in the United States. As early as 1785, Carroll had requested that Charles Plowden return a cohort of Maryland Jesuits studying at the college in Liège to the United States so that they could staff the fledging college. He intended Neale, in particular, to play a significant role in the college's early years. Carroll's requests went unfulfilled until November 1788, when Neale, having completed his studies at Liège, arrived in Baltimore. Carroll initially assigned Neale to the Jesuit estate of St. Thomas Manor, near Port Tobacco.

Neale enjoyed the rural life, and aligned with those Jesuits stationed at the Jesuits' rural Maryland manors who opposed Carroll's establishment of a college. He frequently expressed in correspondence with Carroll his belief that the Jesuits should direct their efforts to ministering to rural congregations in Southern Maryland, rather than on higher education. Neale's relationship with Carroll soured when Neale accused his superior of giving insufficient support to the rural missions, and Carroll chastised Neale for poorly managing his congregation's finances, such as failing to obtain orders for the new American-printed Douay–Rheims Bible. Eventually, Neale became the most outspoken opponent of Carroll's efforts to establish Georgetown College, which he believed to be at the expense of the Maryland Jesuits' rural manors.

== Establishment of Georgetown Chapel ==
In 1790, the governor of Maryland, Thomas Sim Lee, requested that a priest be sent to the rapidly expanding city of Frederick. Carroll sought to transfer Neale to Frederick from St. Thomas Manor, but Neale fell ill at about that time and was unable to go. Later that year, Carroll appointed Neale as the first pastor of the yet-to-be-built Georgetown Chapel, (Note: The Georgetown Chapel, later known as Holy Trinity Church and then as the Chapel of St. Ignatius, was called a "chapel" because it remained uncertain whether it was lawful for Catholics to build public churches in the city.) reasoning that Neale's prominent ancestry and acquaintance with many distinguished families in Georgetown would aid him in raising funds to support the nascent church. Neale did not arrive in Georgetown until January 13, 1792, after recovering from his period of ill health.

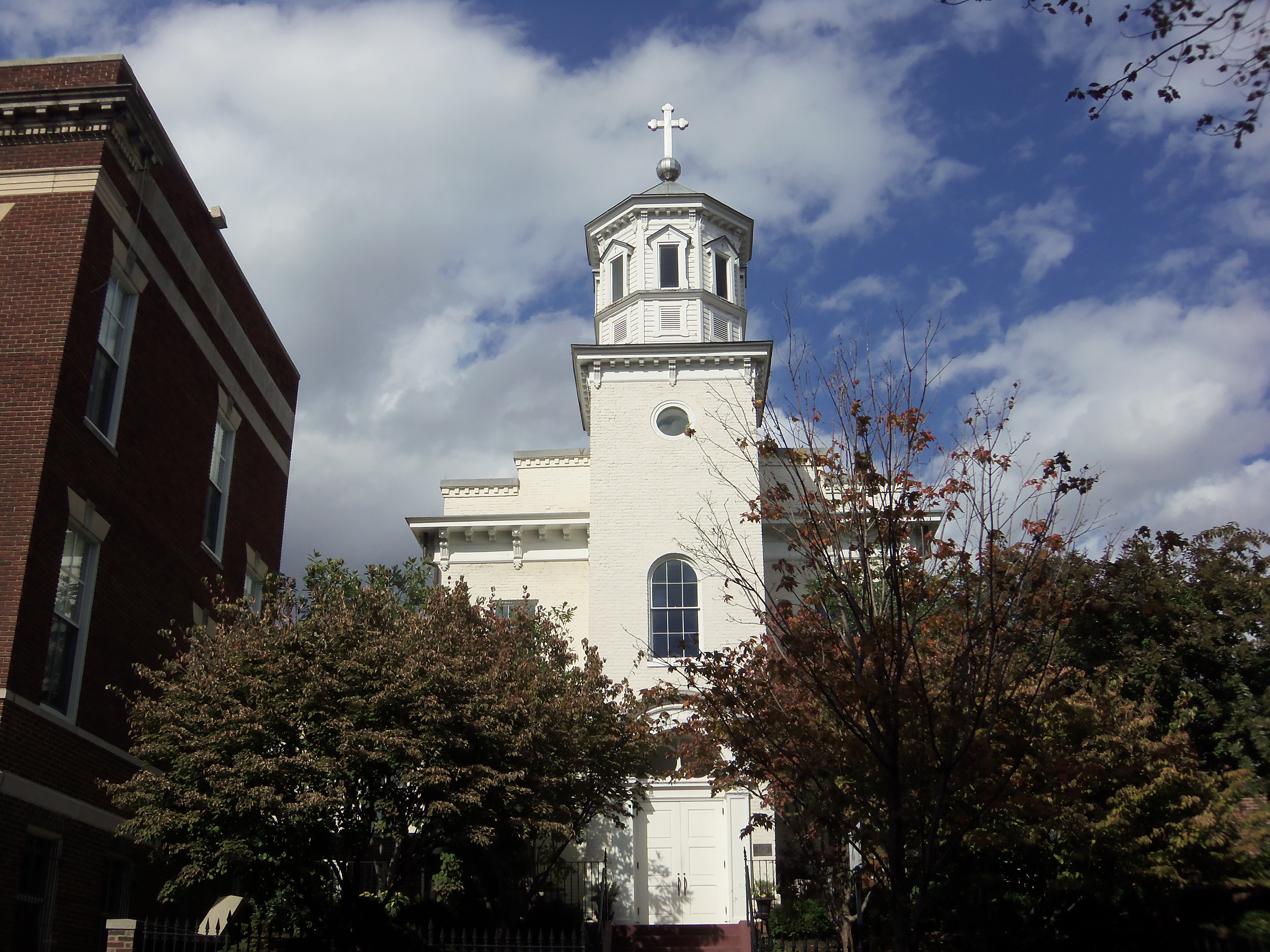
Georgetown Chapel, now adjacent to Holy Trinity Church and known as the Chapel of St. Ignatius

Neale proved to be a successful pastor of the church. He succeeded in raising considerable funds from Catholics in Montgomery, Prince George's, Charles, and St. Mary's counties in Maryland during the first several months of his tenure. This allowed construction on the chapel to begin quickly, and its foundation was complete by the end of 1792; the superstructure was completed the following year. As the new church occupied the entire width of its lot, Neale sought to protect it and its adjacent cemetery from encroachment by purchasing land on either side as a buffer. Contributions proved to be inadequate, and he resorted to supplementing donations with his own funds. He would again contribute his own money fifteen years later to purchase the remainder of the block's width, where the Holy Trinity School now stands. Construction on the Georgetown Chapel was complete by March 1794.

As the first Catholic church in the District of Columbia, the Georgetown Chapel drew parishioners from as far as Dumfries and Great Falls in Virginia and Bladensburg in Maryland. The size of the congregation increased rapidly, and the church soon became overcrowded, despite the erection of makeshift sheds on the sides of the church to augment the size of the building. In 1796, the parish established a mission church in Alexandria, which was the first Catholic church in the state of Virginia. Neale ministered to this church, but its location was considered too remote, so he purchased a former Methodist meeting house more centrally located in Alexandria, and named it the Church of St. Mary.

Relations between Neale and Carroll continued to deteriorate, as Neale resisted Carroll's attempts to sell some of the Jesuits' rural properties. In April 1797, Carroll directed Neale to transfer from Georgetown to the Jesuit's White Marsh Manor, as had been tentatively discussed at a previous meeting of the clergy, despite Neale's opposition. Before this order could be given effect, several wealthy parishioners and lay trustees of the Georgetown Chapel intervened to petition Carroll to keep Neale at Georgetown; Carroll acquiesced, and Neale remained as pastor until 1817, when he was succeeded by Benedict Joseph Fenwick.

In the meantime, Neale had become a prominent member of the Select Body of Clergy of the Corporation of Roman Catholic Clergymen of Maryland, a civil corporation beyond Carroll's authority composed of priests who had been Jesuits before the order's suppression. (Note: The corporation was created in 1792 in response to the suppression of the Society of Jesus. Its purpose was to preserve the property of the former Jesuits with the hope that the Society would be one day restored and the property returned under the ecclesiastical jurisdiction of the Jesuit superior in America.) Neale was made the legal agent of the corporation in 1798.

== Georgetown College ==
In addition to his priestly duties at the Georgetown Chapel, Neale also worked at Georgetown College as treasurer pro tempore, which was his sole source of income, room and board. In August 1797, a special committee of Maryland clergy was drawn up to determine the future of the college. It resolved that the institution was to be run by a five-member board of directors, composed of Maryland clergy who were selected from and by their peers. The effect of this resolution was to deprive Carroll and the incumbent Sulpician president of the college, Louis William DuBourg, of any official control of the school. Neale was selected as one of the five directors. At the board's first meeting in October 1797, Neale was elected vice president of the college, whose duties largely corresponded to those of his existing role of treasurer. He would hold the position of vice president for ten years.

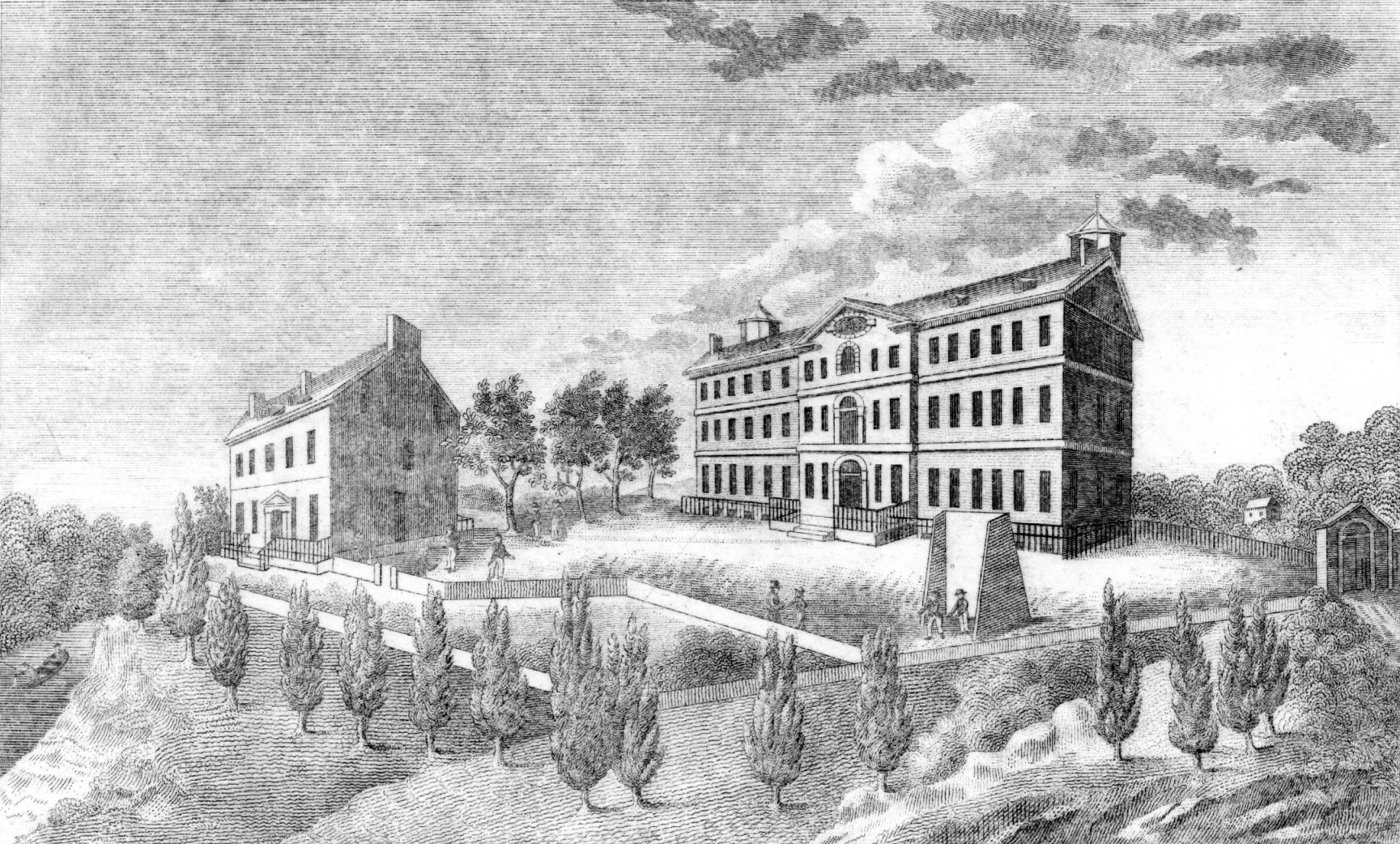
Georgetown College campus in 1829. It would have looked much the same during Neale's presidency.

When the president of Georgetown College, Robert Molyneux, was forced to resign the presidency due to declining health in December 1808, Neale was made the acting president, until a permanent successor could be found in his nephew, William Matthews, in March 1809. Following the end of Matthews' tenure, Neale succeeded him as president on November 1, 1809. He instituted the same severe monastic discipline that his brother, Leonard, had previously implemented at the college during his presidency. Students were required to follow a daily regimen, which heavily focussed on religious activities. Although this resulted in a considerable number of students entering the priesthood, it led to a significant decrease in the number of non-Catholic students and a severe decline in the overall number of students. Enrollment was also affected by competition for students with St. Mary's Seminary and University in Baltimore. At the college, Neale established the first Sodality of the Blessed Virgin in the United States. He also purchased 40 acres (16 hectares) to expand the campus for student recreation.

Neale had little interest in managing the academic affairs of the college, and upon assuming the presidency, transferred responsibility for the school's academics to the vice president. As he simultaneously held other pastoral and administrative positions, he was largely absent from the college. Carroll's evaluation was that the college had "sunk to the lowest degree of discredit." Neale's tenure came to an end in August 1812, and Giovanni Antonio Grassi was named as his successor.

== Involvement in the restored Jesuits ==
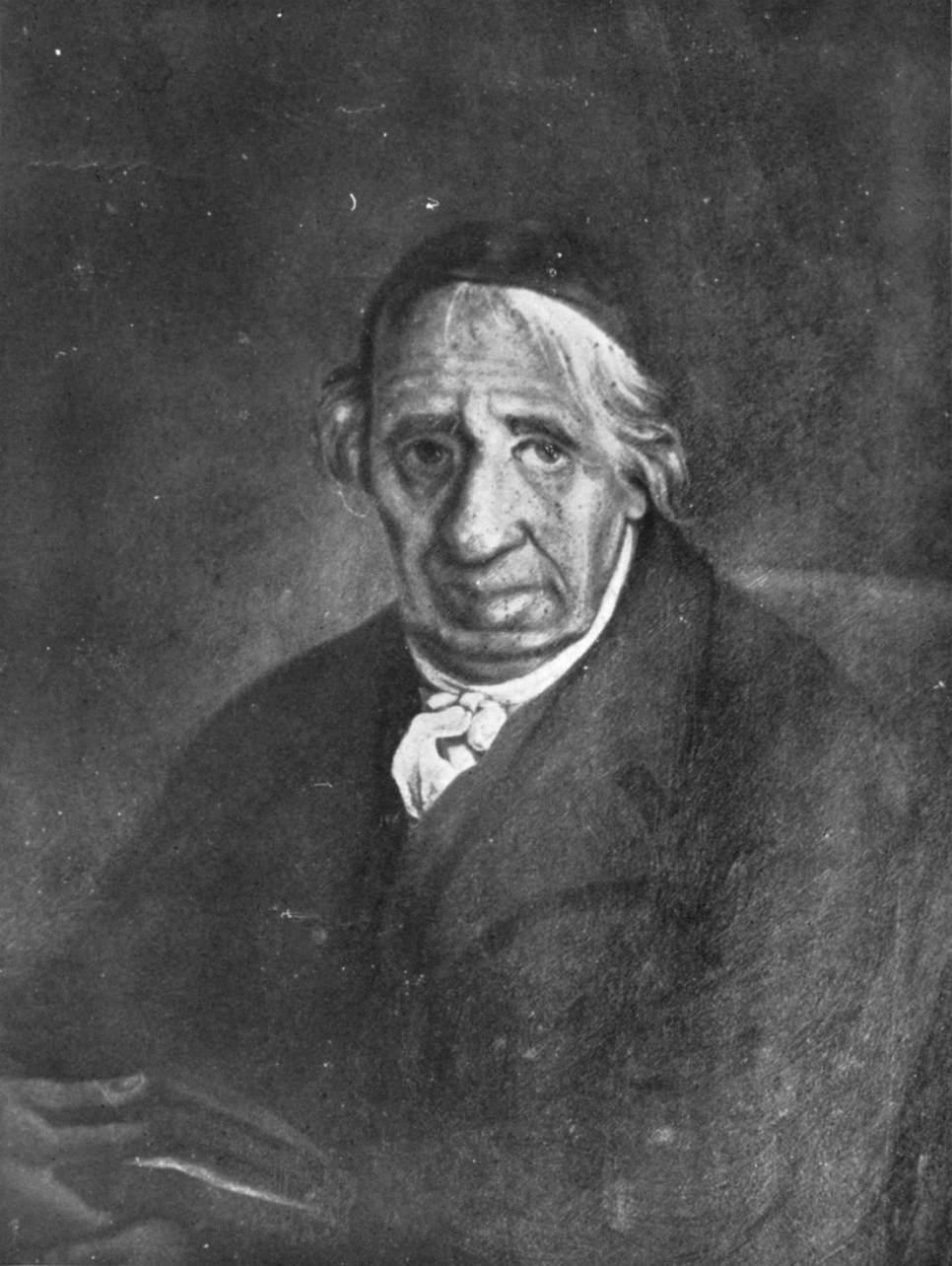
Neale in his later years

In response to the request of Emperor Paul I of Russia, Pope Pius VII issued a bull in 1801 partially lifting the 1773 order of suppression by permitting the Jesuits to officially resume operation in the Russian Empire (which they had been already doing unofficially). Bishop Carroll had long sought to restore the Jesuit order in the United States, and aimed to do so by submitting the Maryland Jesuits to the jurisdiction of the Jesuits' Russian province. He was wary that such an arrangement would contravene the pope's order and might draw the attention of political enemies of the Jesuits. Neale and his brother, Charles, led a group of clergy in persistently urging Carroll to effectuate the arrangement. Carroll was eventually persuaded, and a Jesuit novitiate was formally opened on October 10, 1806, in a house offered for use by Neale, across the street from the now-Holy Trinity Church.

The newly appointed superior of the Maryland Jesuits, Robert Molyneux, named Neale as the master of novices. His selection drew some criticism from the European Jesuits sent at Carroll's request to aid the re-establishment of the Jesuits in the United States, on the grounds that Neale had never been trained in a Jesuit novitiate, and that he would simultaneously be a novice himself. As well as serving as master of novices, Neale assumed the role of treasurer of the Jesuit's Maryland mission. During the War of 1812, Neale had most of the Jesuits' livestock in St. Inigoes removed to White Marsh, to keep them safe from looting by the British.

== Later life ==
Upon the death of his brother Leonard in 1817, Neale assumed his duties as spiritual director to the nuns of the Georgetown Visitation Monastery. He suffered a stroke while in Alexandria. Though this necessitated that he relinquish the full-time position, he continued to hear the nuns' confessions until his death. After his recovery, he once again took up missionary work in rural Maryland. He returned to St. Thomas Manor, where he became pastor of its church, later known as St. Ignatius Church. He served in this office from 1819 until 1837. Neale died on December 20, 1837, and he was buried in the cemetery at St. Thomas Manor.

== Notes ==
Catholic Church titles
New office	1st Pastor of Holy Trinity Church; 1790–1817	Succeeded by Benedict Joseph Fenwick
Preceded by John B. Cary	11th Pastor of St. Ignatius Church; 1819–1837	Succeeded by William McSherry
Academic offices
Preceded by Robert Molyneux	6th President of Georgetown College; 1808–1809	Succeeded by William Matthews
Preceded by William Matthews	8th President of Georgetown College; 1809–1812	Succeeded by Giovanni Antonio Grassi
