= Cornelia J. M. Jordan =

American poet

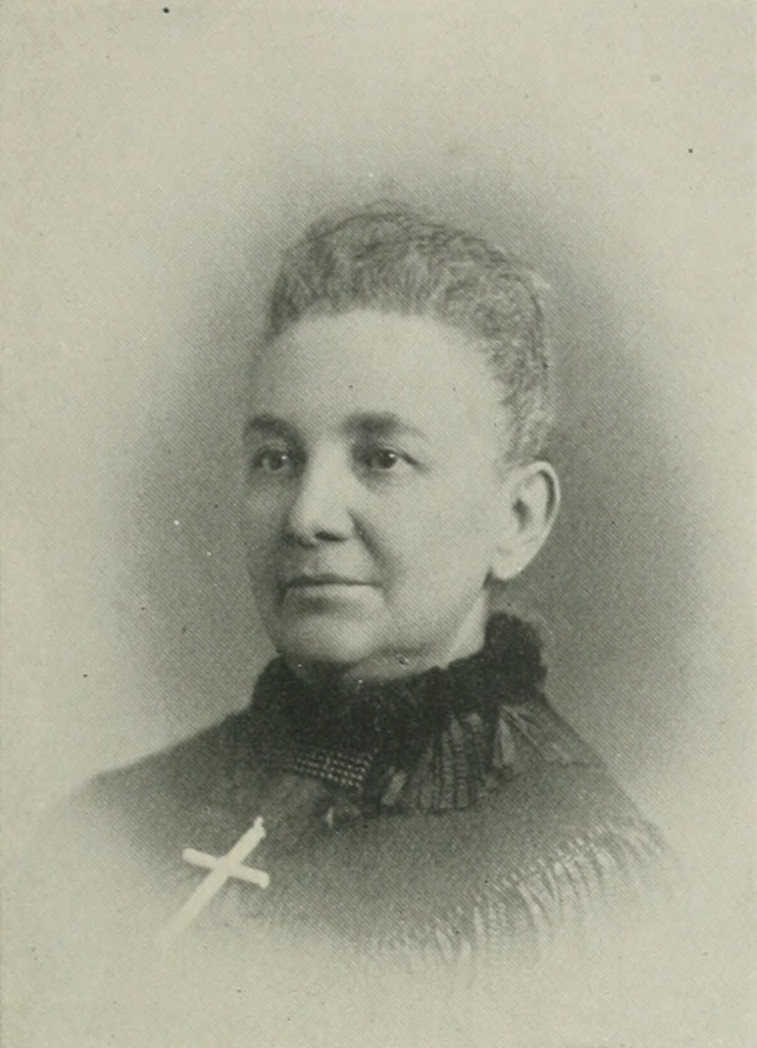
- Photo in A Woman of the Century
- Born: Cornelia Jane Matthews; January 11, 1830; Lynchburg, Virginia, U.S.
- Died: January 16, 1898 (aged 68)
- Resting place: Presbyterian Cemetery, Lynchburg, Virginia
- Education: Sisters of the Visitation
- Occupations: Poet, lyricist
- Spouse: Francis Hubert Jordan (m. 1851; died 1896)
- Writing career
- Language: English

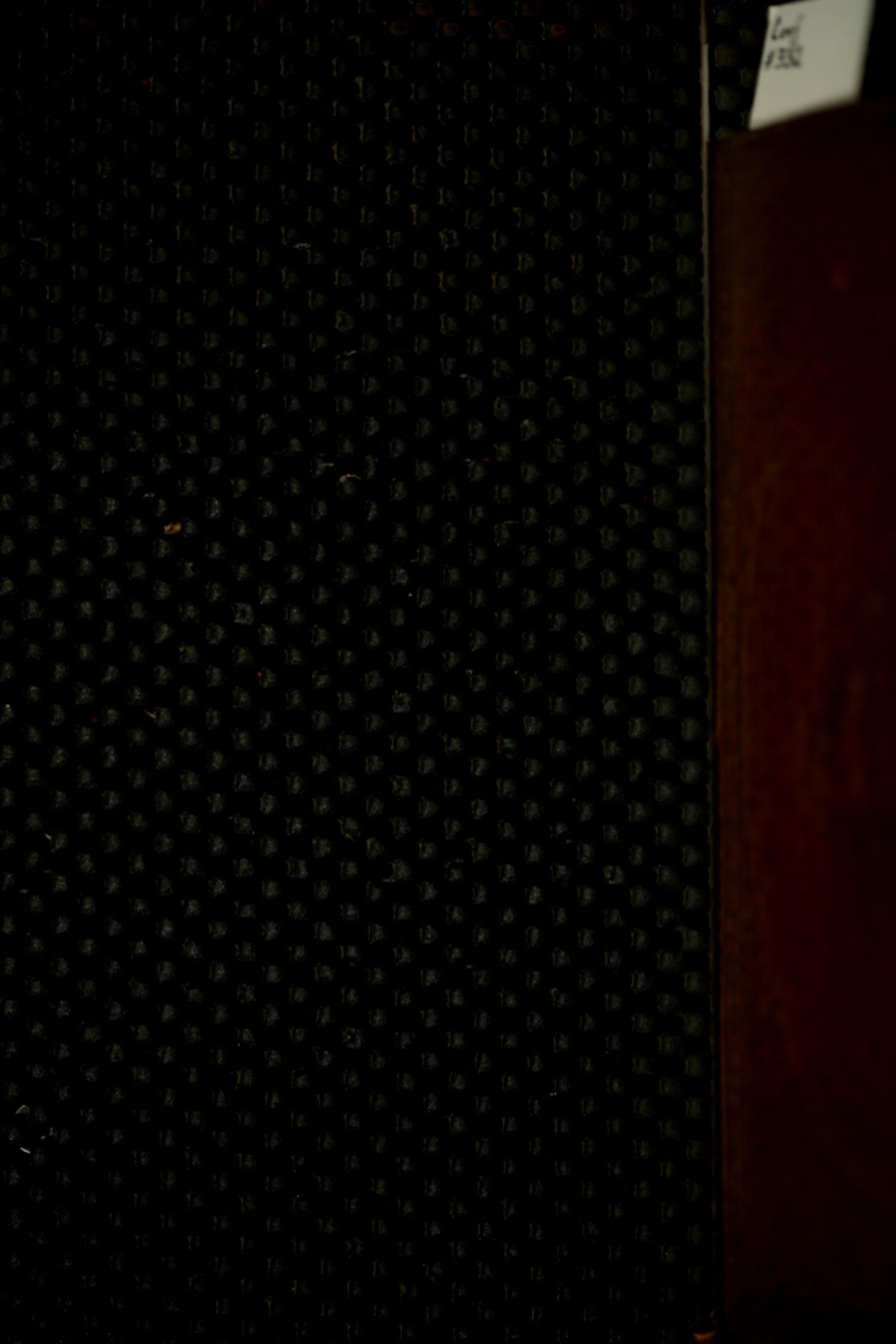
Flowers of hope and memory, 1861

Richmond- her glory and her graves, 1867

Echoes from the cannon , 1899

Cornelia Jane Jordan (née Matthews; January 11, 1830 – January 26, 1898) was an American poet and lyricist associated with the Civil War. Her book of poems entitled Corinth, and other Poems, published after the surrender, was seized by the military commander of Richmond, Virginia and suppressed. She also published a volume entitled Richmond, Her Glory and Her Graves. Jordan contributed many articles to magazines and newspapers, the best of which were "The Battle of Manassas," "The Death of Jackson" and "An Appeal for Jefferson Davis".

== Early life and education ==
Cornelia Jane Matthews was born in Lynchburg, Virginia, January 11, 1830. Her father was Edwin Matthews, a former mayor of that town. Her mother was Emily Goggin Matthews, a sister of William L. Goggin, who figured prominently in Virginia politics before the war. She was born to wealth, and received all the advantages of liberal education and polished society. After her mother's death in 1834, Jordan and two younger sisters were sent to the home of their grandmother in Bedford County.

In 1842, at the age of 12, Jordan was placed in the school of the Convent of the Visitation, Georgetown, Washington, D.C.. Her poetical productions being numerous and excellent, she was the poet-laureate of her schoolmates.

== Career ==
In 1851, she married Francis Hubert Jordan (1821–1896), a lawyer from Luray, Virginia, where she made her home. During the first years of her married life, she wrote a great deal. A collection of her poems was published in Richmond, in 1860, with the title, Flowers of Hope and Memory. During the Civil War, she wrote many stirring lyrics. A volume of these, entitled Corinth, and Other Poems, was published after the surrender. It was seized by the military commander in Richmond and suppressed as seditious.

In 1867, she published Richmond: Her Glory and Her Graves, in a volume with some shorter lyrics. She contributed many poems to magazines and newspapers. Her best-known war poems were "The Battle of Manassas", "The Death of Jackson", and "An Appeal for Jefferson Davis". Her "Funeral Flowers" touched a sympathetic chord, while "Old Confed'" was copied into various Southern journals.

Cornelia Jane Jordan died in 1898, aged 68.

== Selected works ==
- Flowers of Hope and Memory, 1860
- "Of such is the Kingdom of Heaven" : the blighted bud, a mother's record of a little life soon ended., 1861
- Corinth, and other poems of the war, 1865
- Richmond: Her Glory and Her Graves, 1867
- Echoes from the cannon, 1899
