= Georgetown Visitation Monastery =

Roman Catholic monastery in Washington, D.C., United States

Coordinates: 38.9103°N 77.0712°W

Monastery of the Visitation, Georgetown
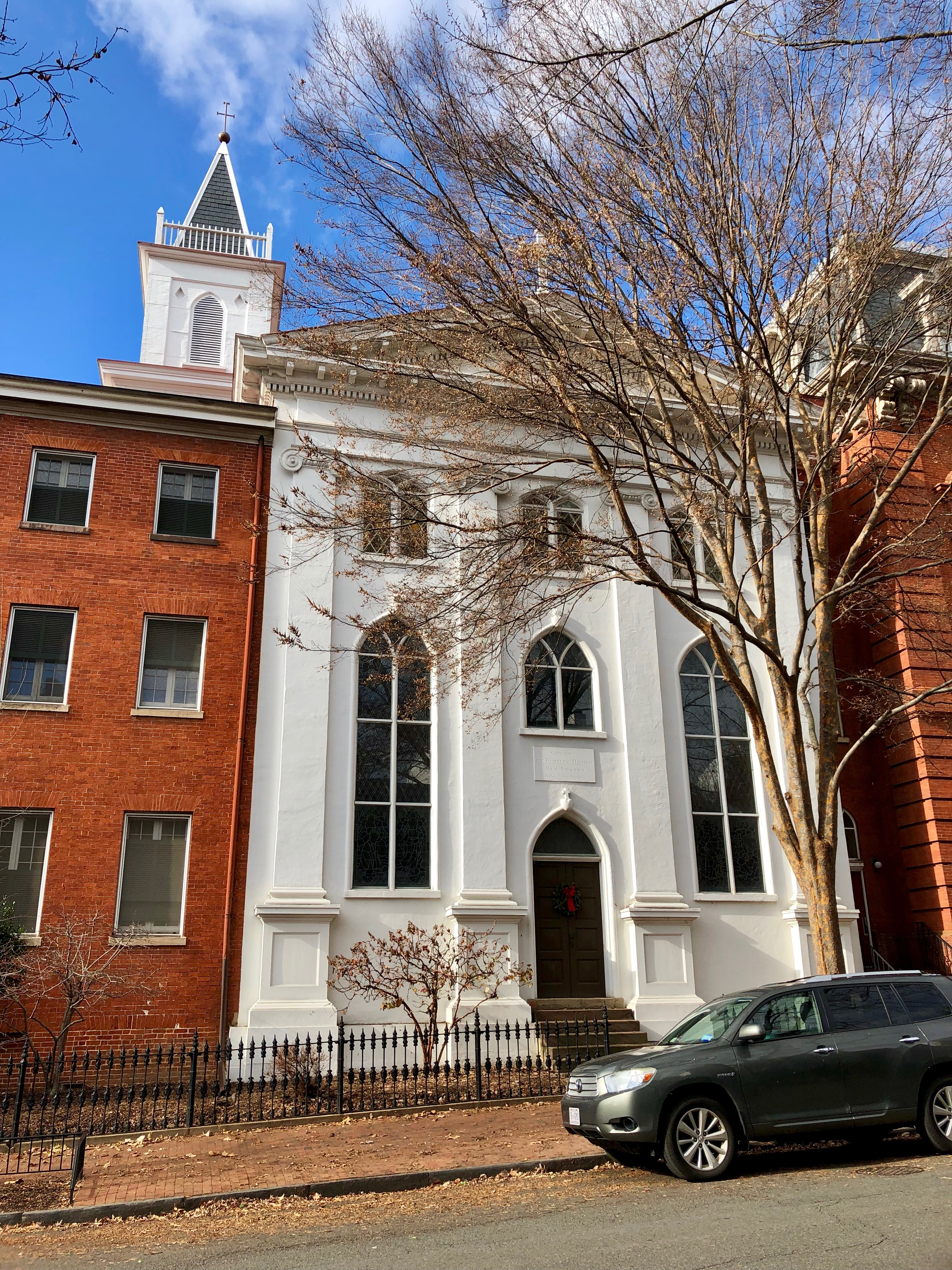

Location
- Country: United States
- Interactive map of Monastery of the Visitation, Georgetown

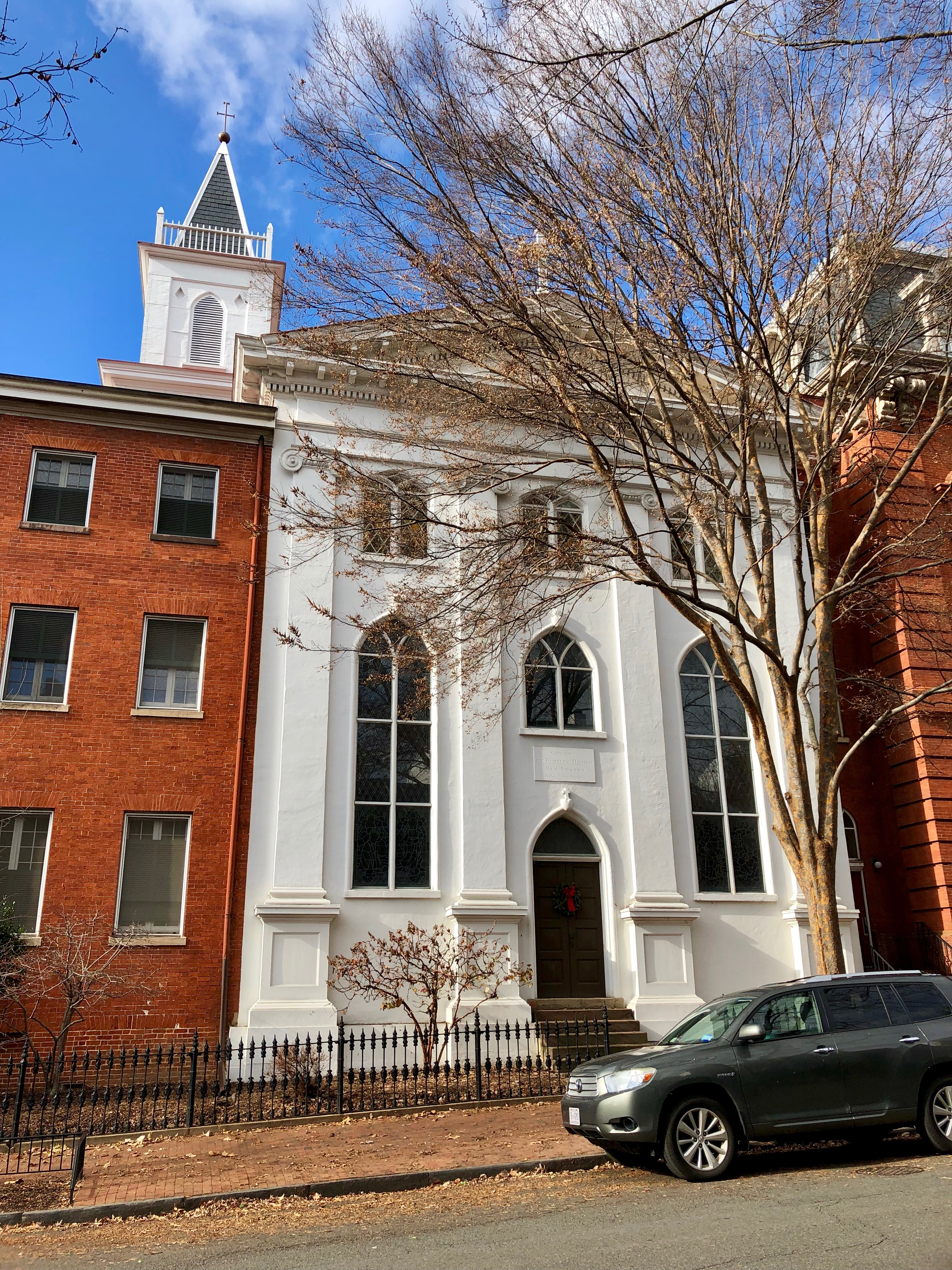
Visitation Monastery, Georgetown

The Monastery of the Visitation, Georgetown is a monastery of the Visitation Order in the District of Columbia, United States of America.

== History ==
=== Founding ===
This monastery was founded by Alice Lalor, native of County Kilkenny, Ireland, who sailed for this country in 1794 with her sister, Mrs. Doran, the wife of an American merchant. On the voyage she formed an intimacy with Maria Sharpe and Maria McDermott and, united in their vocation, they bought a small house in Philadelphia and began their community life under the direction of Leonard Neale, who had succeeded Lawrence Graessel and Francis Fleming, victims of the yellow fever epidemic of 1793.

The return of the fever in 1797-8 broke up their house, and Neale having been made president of Georgetown College invited them to settle in that place. Lalor bought a small cottage near that of three French noblewomen of the Order of Poor Clares, who had escaped the revolutionary Terror and hoped to found a house in the land of their asylum. Neale put the Congregation of the Pious Ladies, as they were called, under the Rule of St. Francis de Sales. His inspiration was to advance Catholic education.

=== Opening of the school ===
The school was opened, 24 June 1799. The first pupil was Anna Smith, the first novice Aloysia Neale. Their ranks were immediately recruited, their pupils multiplied, and in 1802 the school was developed into an academy, (now known as Georgetown Visitation Preparatory School). In 1804 the Poor Clares returned to France; Bishop Neale and his brother Francis Neale bought their property, furniture, and books, and it was among the last that the Rules of the Visitation were discovered in 1812, after being vainly sought for years by the bishop, for Annecy had been swept away in the Terror.

No enclosure was observed at first and the ladies were called Mistress or Madam until 1816 when Archbishop Neale obtained from Pope Pius VII the Brief dated 14 July, which raised the community to the rank of a monastery. Solemn vows were taken, 28 Dec., 1816, by 30 choir sisters, 4 lay sisters, and 1 out sister. John W. Beschter, formerly of the papal choir, instructed them in the chants of the office and the Visitandines of Chaillot sent them a model of the habit and silver crosses.

Six months later, Archbishop Neale died, but he had appointed Joseph Picot de Limoëlan, a Chouan who was involved in the plot of the rue Saint-Nicaise, of Charleston, South Carolina, as director of the community. He arrived on 13 January 1818 and devoted his life to his new charge. He sold his estate in Brittany and gave the proceeds, as well as his French pension, to building a new chapel for the sisters. Cloriviere himself taught French at the academy, which served to increase enrollment. He asked and obtained from his friend Charles X of France an altar-piece, and by every means in his power helped the sisters in their poor school - the first free school in the District of Columbia.

Catharine Rigden broke ground for the chapel, the symbolic window of which was given by a lady in South Carolina. This was the first chapel of the Sacred Heart in the United States. In 1819 the first prospectus was issued over the signatures of Henrietta Brent, Jerusha Barber, and Joseph de Cloriviere; in 1823 a new academy was built, and in 1829 three European sisters arrived.

=== After Teresa Lalor ===
On 9 September 1846, Teresa Lalor died, having seen her daughters established at Kaskaskia, Mobile, St. Louis, Baltimore, and Brooklyn. In 1872-3 a new academy building was erected, and in 1899–1900, after a fire, this was enlarged.

Archbishop Neale, Joseph de Cloriviere, Lalor, Sister Joanna, Juana Maria de Iturbide, ex-Princess of Mexico; and the thirty original sisters are laid in the crypt of the chapel and buried in the walls of its foundations.

At Winfield Scott's request the academy was exempted from seizure for hospital purposes during the American Civil War. His daughter Virginia (May Emmanuel), who was a Visitation nun, is buried in the cemetery.

== Slavery ==
During the 19th century, the sisters owned some 121 African Americans as slaves.

== Notable alumni ==
- Cornelia Jane Matthews Jordan (1830–1898), poet
- Harriet Monroe (1860–1936), poet, editor
- Cora Stuart Wheeler (1852–1897), poet, author
