= Michael Levadoux =

French missionary (1746–1815)

Michael Levadoux (1746–1815) was a French Sulpician, one of those who left France during the French Revolution. He went to the United States and founded St. Mary's Seminary in Baltimore.

== Life ==
Levadoux was born on April 1, 1746 at Clermont-Ferrand, in Auvergne, France. He studied theology at the Sulpician Seminary at Clermont beginning on October 30, 1769. He spent one year at "Solitude", or Sulpician novitiate. He was the director of the Grand séminaire de Limoges from 1774 to 1791.

In consequence of the threatening aspect of affairs for Catholicism during the French Revolution, Jacques-André Emery, Superior-General of the Sulpicians, deemed it prudent to found a house of their institute abroad, and at the suggestion of Antonio Dugnani, nuncio at Paris, the United States was chosen. Negotiations were opened with Bishop Carroll, recently consecrated, and after some delay Francis C. Nagot was named first director of the projected seminary at Baltimore. With him was associated Levadoux, John Tessier, Gamier, and Montdésir, together with several seminarians.

Delavau, canon of St. Martin of Tours, and François-René de Chateaubriand joined the party, which sailed from Saint Malo, April 8, 1791, and after a tempestuous and roundabout voyage reached Baltimore July 10. For one year, Levadoux, as treasurer, assisted Nagot in organizing the Seminary of St. Mary's, and was then sent by the latter to the Illinois mission, for which Emery had at first destined Chicoisneau, deeming Levadoux a better administrator of temporal affairs. Empowered as vicar-general by Carroll, he took his departure for the West on January 15, 1792.

His missionary labors centred on Cahokia and Kaskaskia. The registers of the latter place bear his signature from December 1792, and he seems to have spent most of his time from 1793 to 1796 at Cahokia, though after Benedict Joseph Flaget left Fort Vincennes in 1795 he visited that post also. Meanwhile, as the health of Nagot, superior of the Sulpicians in the United States, was failing fast, he was desirous of having Levadoux near him at Baltimore, that he might be ready to succeed him in office. But Carroll was no less anxious to secure his services for Detroit.

The bishop's wishes prevailed, and Levadoux became parish priest of Basilica of Sainte Anne de Détroit in 1796. Gabriel Richard joined him as assistant priest two years later. It was Levadoux who performed the obsequies of F. X. Dufaux, missionary to the Hurons at the parish of the Assumption opposite Detroit, who died at his post September 10, 1796. After the death of Dufaux, Levadoux had frequent occasion to minister to the spiritual wants of the Native Americans and of other scattered Catholics from Sandusky and Mackinaw to Fort Wayne. Gabriel Richard joined him on June 7, 1798, as the assistant pastor. In 1801, Nagot recalled Levadoux to Baltimore.

In 1803, Levadoux received orders from Emery to return to France, where he was soon appointed superior of the Seminary of St. Flour in Auvergne, and remained there until the dispersion of the Sulpicians by Napoleon I, in 1811. When their institute was revived, in 1814, Duclaux, successor of Emery, placed Levadoux at the head of the Seminary of Le-Puy-en-Velay.

Levadoux died at Le-Puy-en-Velay on January 13, 1815.

== Bibliography ==
- The Story of Ste Anne de Detroit Church, Detroit Michigan 1701-1976 (PDF). Custombook, Inc. 1976.
