= Leonard Neale =

American Catholic bishop (1746–1817)

The Most Reverend Leonard Neale SJ
- Archbishop of Baltimore
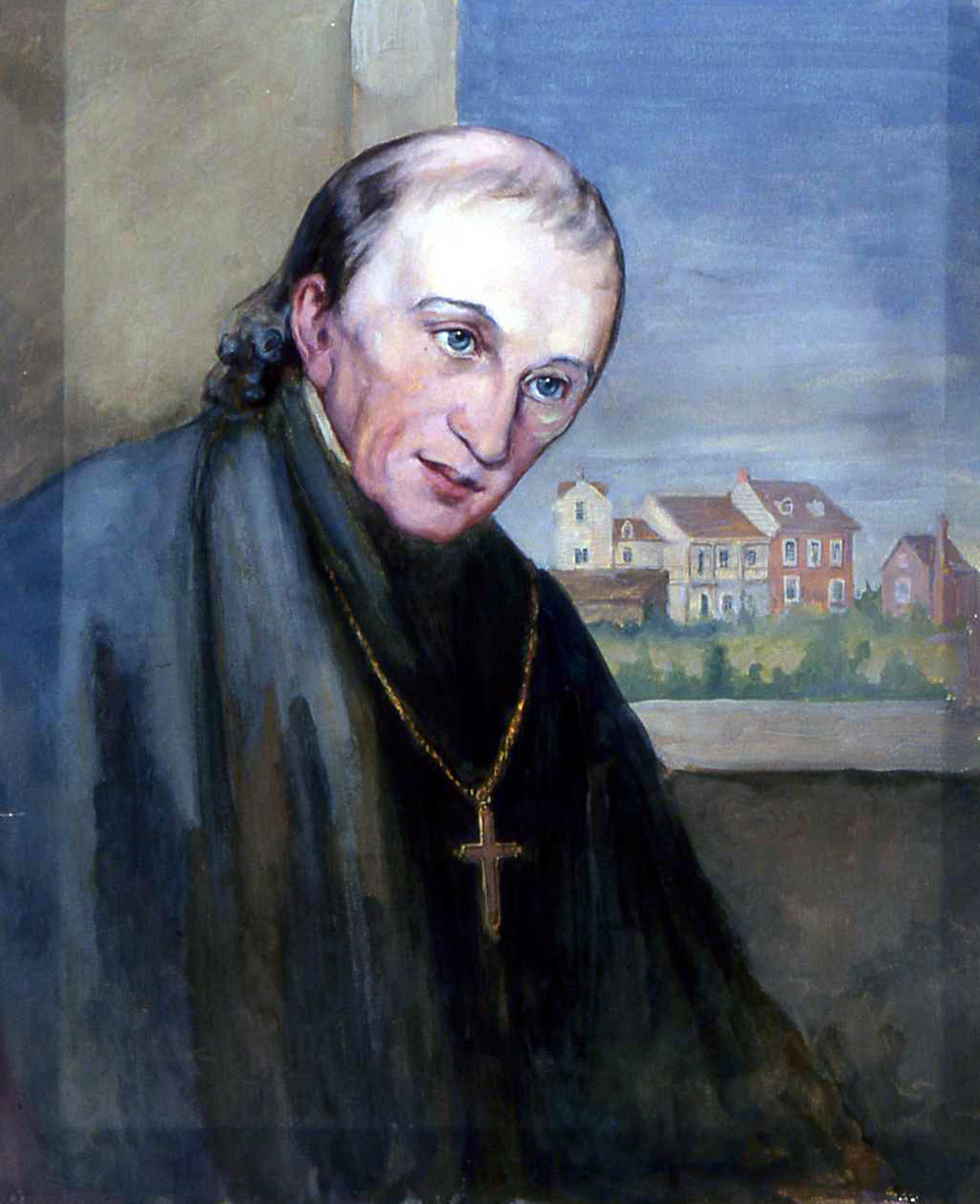
- Archdiocese: Baltimore
- Installed: December 3, 1815
- Term ended: June 18, 1817
- Predecessor: John Carroll
- Successor: Ambrose Maréchal
- Previous posts: Coadjutor Bishop of Baltimore (1795–1815); Titular Bishop of Gortyna (1795–1815); Vicar General of Baltimore (1793–1799)

Orders
- Ordination: June 5, 1773
- Consecration: December 7, 1800 by John Carroll

Personal details
- Born: October 15, 1746 Port Tobacco, Province of Maryland, British America
- Died: June 18, 1817 (aged 70) Baltimore, Maryland, U.S.
- Buried: Georgetown Visitation Monastery
- Denomination: Catholic Church
- Education: Colleges of St Omer, Bruges and Liège

Leonard Neale SJ (October 15, 1746 – June 18, 1817) was an American Catholic prelate and Jesuit who became the second archbishop of Baltimore and the first Catholic bishop to be ordained in the United States. While president of Georgetown College, Neale became the coadjutor bishop to Bishop John Carroll and founded the Georgetown Visitation Monastery and Academy.

Neale was born in the British Province of Maryland to a prominent family that produced many Catholic leaders, including his brothers, Francis and Charles. He was educated in Europe, where he entered the Society of Jesus in 1767. Neale then volunteered to become a missionary in a Dutch colony in South America in 1779. He spent four years there, before becoming discouraged by the resistance from both the European colonists and indigenous people to his proselytism. He returned to Maryland, where he rejoined his former Jesuit colleagues from Europe at St. Thomas Manor.

In 1793, Neale was appointed pastor of Old St. Joseph's and Old St. Mary's Churches in Philadelphia. Bishop Carroll also made him vicar general for Philadelphia and the northern states. During the yellow fever epidemic in Philadelphia, Neale established the first Catholic orphanage there to care for the many orphaned children.

Neale served as president of Georgetown College in Washington from 1799 to 1806, where his imposition of strict discipline helped cause declining student enrollment. Though he was appointed coadjutor bishop in 1795, Neale was not consecrated until 1800. Neale supported the restoration of the Jesuits in the United States, which occurred in 1805. Neale became the Archbishop of Baltimore in 1815. He faced several conflicts with lay trustees, one resulting in a temporary schism at a parish in Charleston, South Carolina.

== Early life ==
Leonard Neale was born on October 15, 1746, at Chandler's Hope, the Neale family estate near Port Tobacco Village in the British Province of Maryland. His ancestors included Captain James Neale, who arrived from England in 1637 after receiving a royal grant of 2,000 acres (810 ha) in the future Port Tobacco.

Neale's parents, William Neale and Anne Neal née Brooke, had thirteen children. Two of Neale's brothers died early, while the four surviving brothers became Catholic priests. Reverend Charles Neale served as superior of the American Jesuit community. Another brother, Reverend Francis Neale, became president of Georgetown College. A sister, Anne Neale, served in the Order of Poor Clares in Aire-sur-la-Lys, France Another sister, Mary Neale Williams, was the mother of Reverend William Matthews, another president of Georgetown College.

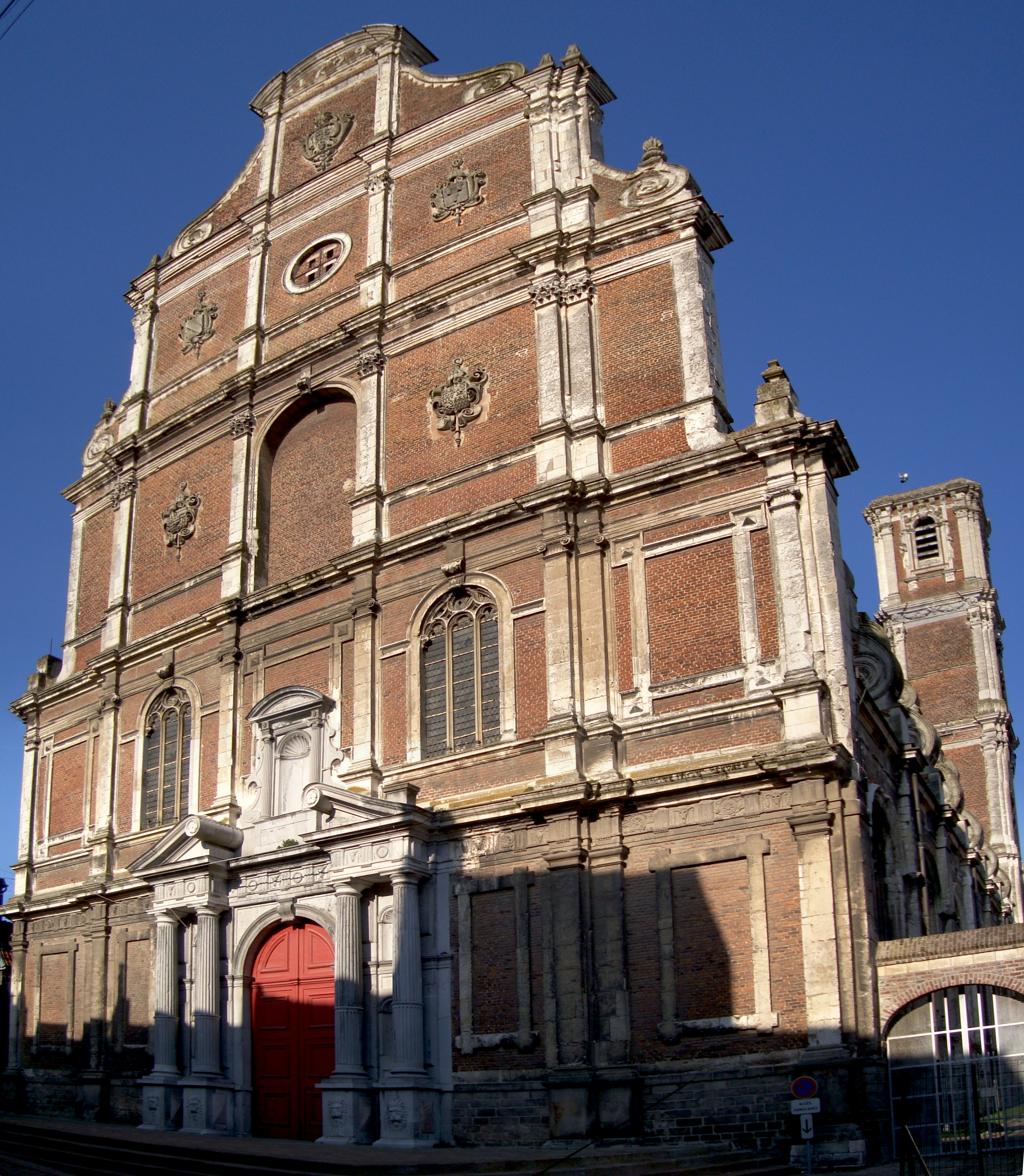
Chapel of the former Jesuit college in Saint-Omer, France (2009)

As a young boy, Neale attended the Bohemia Manor School in Bohemia Manor, Maryland. Anne Neale wanted to further her sons' education in a Catholic college in Maryland, but the provincial government had banned them. She was forced to send them all to the College of English Jesuits at Saint-Omer in France.

Leonard Neale left for Saint-Omer in 1758 at age 12, where he achieved a good academic record. As a child, Neale had decided to become a priest and now decided to fulfill that ambition. He moved to Bruges in Flanders in the Austrian Netherlands to continue his studies when the college relocated there in 1762. Neale entered the Society of Jesus on September 7, 1767. When the college relocated a second time to Liège in the Austrian Netherlands, Neale completed his study of philosophy and theology in that city.

== Priest in Europe ==
Neale was ordained a priest for the Society of Jesus in Liège on June 5, 1773, by Bishop Franz Karl von Velbrück. Immediately after his ordination, Neale returned to the College of Liège to join the faculty there. However, his tenure at the college was very short lived.

On July 7, 1773, Pope Clement XIV published Dominus ac Redemptor, which ordered the worldwide suppression of the Jesuits. In response, the Austrian Empire seized the College of Liège and expelled all the Jesuits priests from the Austrian Netherlands. Neale then moved to England, along with the rest of the English Jesuits. He spent the next four years ministering to a small Catholic congregation in Hardwick, County Durham.

Neale was later able to return to Liège, where he spent two years, then to Brussels. Neale spent his final time in Europe working as a chaplain at the convent of the Canonesses Regular of the Holy Sepulchre in Bruges.

== Missionary in South America ==
In 1779, at Neale's request, the Jesuit Order sent him to Demerara, a Dutch West India Company colony that is part of present-day Guyana, to serve as a missionary. Neale initially worked on evangelizing the European colonists, but they rejected his attempts and barred him from building a chapel in the colony. Neale then turned his attention to the conversion of the indigenous people who lived in the forests.

Neale found that proselytizing the indigenous people was equally difficult. On one occasion, Neale was passing through a tribal village when he saw a small child who was dying. His father, a tribal chief implored Neale to cure him. Neale baptized the boy, who then miraculously recovered from his illness. The chief and his family all converted to Catholicism along with a few other villagers. However, the indigenous people generally resisted Neale's efforts and also refused to permit construction of a chapel on their lands. Discouraged and weakened from malaria, Neale left Demerara in January 1783, setting sail for Maryland. His voyage was delayed briefly when the Royal Navy seized his ship near Demerara during the Fourth Anglo-Dutch War. Neale arrived in Maryland in April 1783 after 25 years in Europe and South America.

== Priest in Maryland ==
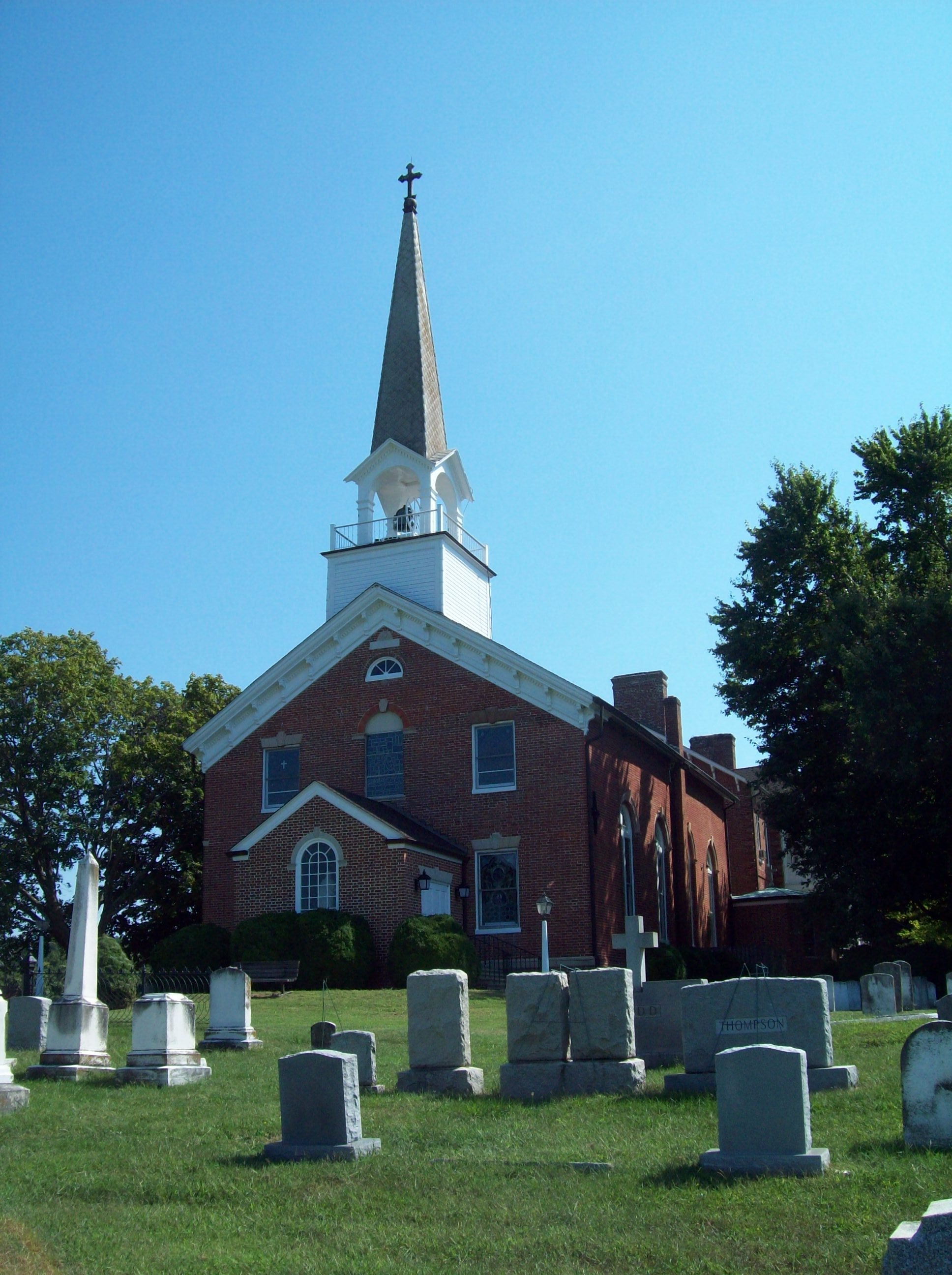
St. Thomas Manor, Bowie, Maryland (2009)

Once back in Maryland, Neale started serving at St. Thomas Manor near Chandler's Hope, the family estate. With the end of the American Revolution, Reverend John Carroll, a Jesuit colleague from Europe, started meeting with the few priests in the area to lay the foundations for the new American Catholic Church. Neale attended the first meeting of the Corporation of Roman Catholic Clergymen of Maryland (Note: The corporation was created in 1792 in response to the suppression of the Society of Jesus. Its purpose was to preserve the property of the former Jesuits with the hope that the Society would be one day restored and the property returned under the ecclesiastical jurisdiction of the Jesuit superior in America.) at White Marsh Manor in Bowie, Maryland, in 1783. He remained an active member of this group in the succeeding years.

In 1793, Carroll and a group of supporters started raising money to fund the establishment of the Academy of Georgetown in present-day Washington, D.C. Neale led a group of priests opposed to Carroll's selling corporation land owned to finance the new institution.

== Vicar General of Philadelphia ==
In 1793, Neale volunteered to go to Philadelphia to help the church there during a yellow fever epidemic, despite his own weak health. The disease had killed ten percent of the city's population. At Old St. Joseph's Church, the pastor, Dominic Graessel, two assistant priests and hundreds of parishioners had died during the epidemic. Neale started serving as pastor of both Old St. Joseph's Church and Old St. Mary's Church. Carroll also named Neale as vicar general, responsible for supervising Catholics in Philadelphia and all the northern states. Neale himself contracted yellow fever at one point; he survived the illness, but never fully recovered his health.

While serving in Philadelphia, Neale met Alice Lalor, a young woman who was a devout Catholic. Before coming to the United States, Lalor had promised to help her bishop in Ireland found a religious order in Kilkenny. However, her family insisted that she immigrate with them. Lalor vowed to return to Ireland in two years to set up the community. Neale convinced her to instead found a religious community in Philadelphia. Lalor and two other women, with Neale's assistance, established a small Catholic school for girls in Philadelphia. However, Lalor was soon forced to close the school after her two co-founders died of yellow fever.

In 1796, Neale faced a challenge of his authority from the lay board of trustees at one of Philadelphia's parishes. Used to their independence, the board believed that it, not the bishop, had the right to control parish property and the selection of priests. After yellow fever broke out again in Philadelphia in 1797 and 1798, Neale established the first Catholic orphanage in the city to care for children orphaned by the disease.

According to legend, Neale converted former US President George Washington to Catholicism while he was dying in 1799. Neale received a summons to come to Mount Vernon, the Washington estate in Virginia. Travelling down the Potomac River from St. Thomas Manor, Neale allegedly met with Washington. He heard his confession and then conditionally baptized him, receiving him into the Catholic Church. The story was passed along over time by other Jesuit priests and enslaved people at Mount Vernon. However, the Catholic historian Martin I. J. Griffin concluded that it was probably untrue. Written accounts by witnesses of Washington's final hours did not mention the presence of Neale or any other clergy.

== Coadjutor Bishop of Baltimore ==
As the Diocese of Baltimore grew in size and population, Carroll requested that the Sacred Congregation de Propaganda Fide appoint Neale as coadjutor bishop of Baltimore to assist him. On March 23, 1795, the Propaganda Fide selected Neale as coadjutor bishop and Pope Pius VI confirmed its selection on April 17. The pope also named Neale as the titular bishop of Gortyna. Neale's tenure as pastor of St. Joseph's and St. Mary's ended in March 1799 when he left Philadelphia to become president of Georgetown University in Washington, D.C.

Due to the ongoing turmoil in Europe resulting from the French Revolution, the bulls of appointment were twice lost in transit. Cardinal Stefano Borgia was finally able to forward them to Carroll in the summer of 1800. Neale was consecrated a bishop on December 7, 1800, at St. Peter's Pro-Cathedral in Baltimore by Carroll, with Reverends Francis Nagot and Francis Beeston serving as co-consecrators. With this ceremony, Neale became the first bishop to be consecrated in the United States. Despite his elevation to coadjutor bishop, Neale continued to reside in Washington.

=== Georgetown University ===
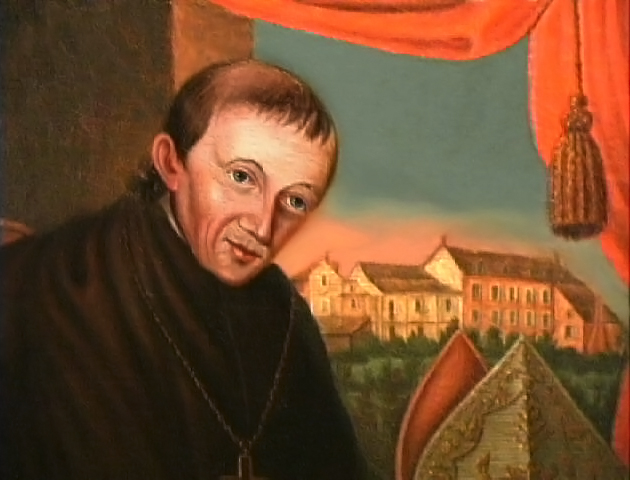
Neale as president of Georgetown College (pre-1891)

In 1799, Carroll named Neale as president of Georgetown College, the successor institution to the Academy of Georgetown. Carroll also named Francis Neale as vice president of the college, responsible for its finances. Leonard Neale assumed office on March 30, 1799. Neale moved from Philadelphia to Washington to live on the Georgetown campus, as requested by the college board of directors. To save money, Neale slept on a folding bed in the college library. He also served as a tutor at the college. Neale would continue to serve as president of Georgetown after he was named coadjutor bishop of Baltimore in 1800.

As president of Georgetown, Neale instituted strict discipline on the student body, adopting a quasi-monastic regimen. To eliminate fraternization between the seminarians and the lay students, he segregated the seminarians from all lay students and moved the non-Catholic lay students to off-campus housing.

Enrollment at Georgetown started to drop. The low enrollment meant that the college did not have enough revenue to finish the Old North building or even guarantee food for its students. Carroll complained that Neale's strict rules were driving lay students away from Georgetown, causing the financial problems. The college also faced increase competition for lay students from St. Mary's Seminary in Baltimore. Its leader, former Georgetown president Louis DuBourg, had opened a program for these students. Neale responded by expanding the course of studies at Georgetown, adding philosophy in 1801 as the final course in the full Jesuit curriculum.

=== Jesuit restoration ===
The 1773 suppression of the Jesuits, which prohibited them in the United States and elsewhere around the world, had not been enforced by the Russian tsars against the small Jesuit community in the Russian Empire. In 1805, Pope Pius VII, at the request of Emperor Paul I of Russia, issued a papal bull that officially lifted the order of suppression in Russia. Leonard Neale and his brothers, Francis and Charles, told Carroll that if Jesuit priests in the United States affiliated with the Jesuit province in Russia, it would under church law restore the Jesuit community in the United States. Though initially dubious of the feasibility of this scheme, Carroll eventually consented to it. He and Leonard Neale then petitioned Reverend Gabriel Gruber, the Jesuit Superior General, to make the affiliation.

In 1805, the Society of Jesus was allowed to reestablish in the United States, with two new Jesuit priests arriving from Europe that same year. Neale was now able to open a Jesuit novitiate at Georgetown College. Carroll succeeded in recruiting several European Jesuits, such as Reverend Anthony Kohlmann, to come to Georgetown to serve as priests and teach. With the addition of several Jesuit priests, Neale was able to phase out all the lay faculty at the college. The college faculty now consisted of Jesuit priests, Sulpician priests, secular priests and seminarians. He also expanded the course of studies by adding philosophy, the final course in the full Jesuit curriculum.

=== Georgetown Visitation Monastery and Academy ===
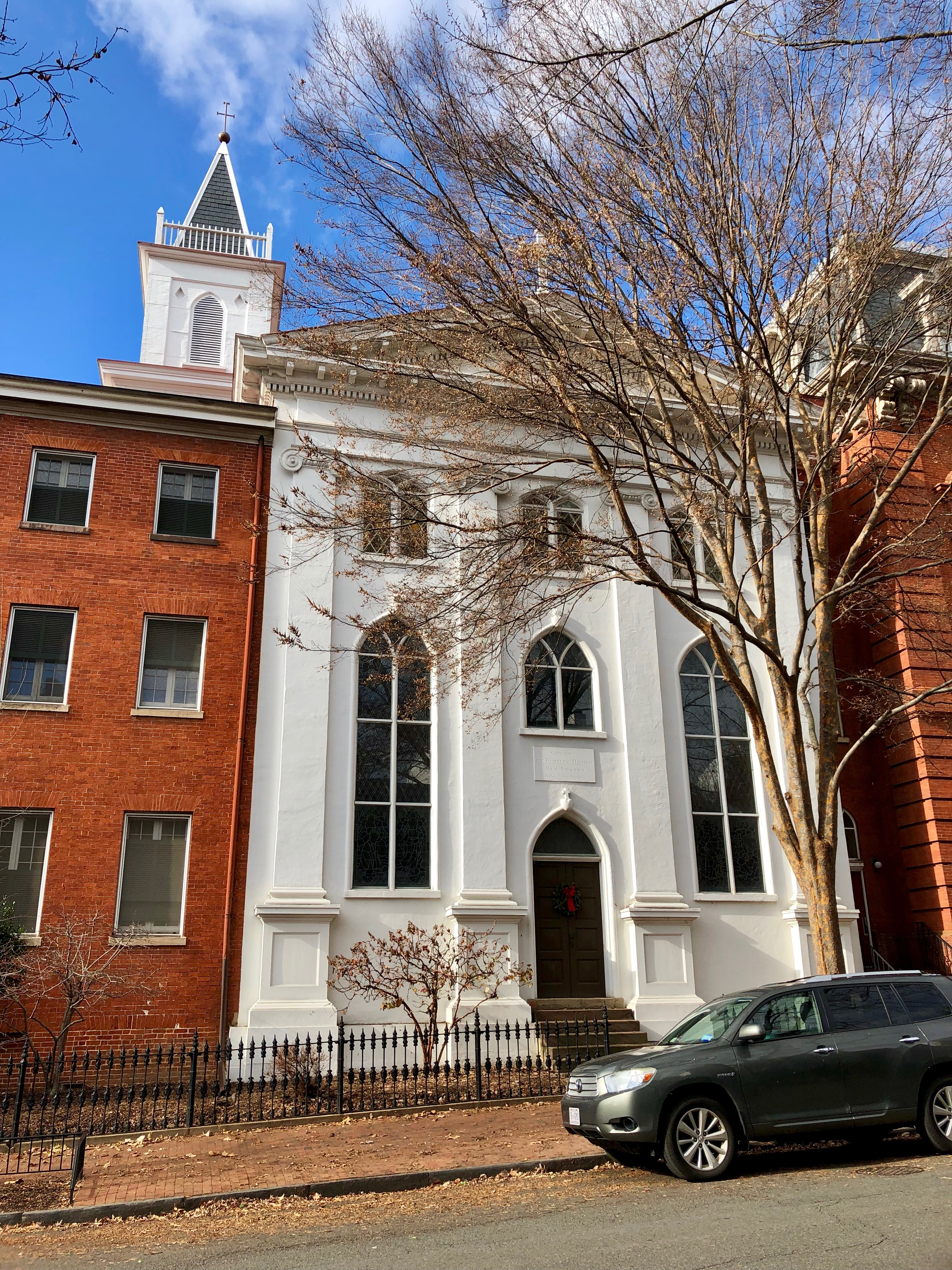
Georgetown Visitation Monastery, Washington, D.C. (2018)

As the Catholic population of Washington grew, a need arose for a Catholic girls school. Neale suggested to Lalor, his friend from Philadelphia, that she start a religious community to operate a girls school in Washington. Lalor and two of her associates, Maria McDermott and Maria Sharpe, moved to the District of Columbia, taking up temporary residence at a Poor Clares community in Georgetown. The women soon became known as the "three pious ladies".

With Neale's guidance, the women decided to enter the Order of the Visitation of Holy Mary. Neale drew up the rules for the new enclosed religious community. When the Poor Clares sisters decided to return to Europe, Neale purchased their building in Georgetown and turned it over to the Visitation sisters on June 29, 1808. The sisters then opened Georgetown Visitation Academy, the forerunner of Georgetown Visitation Preparatory School. Neale received the nuns' simple vows in 1813 and remained their spiritual director for the rest of his life.

Neale resigned as president of Georgetown College in 1806. When Neale departed, the college had only 26 lay students and its main building was in disrepair. However, the number of Jesuit novices at the college had risen. Neale moved off campus to a residence near the Georgetown Visitation Monastery, living there until his death.

== Archbishop of Baltimore ==
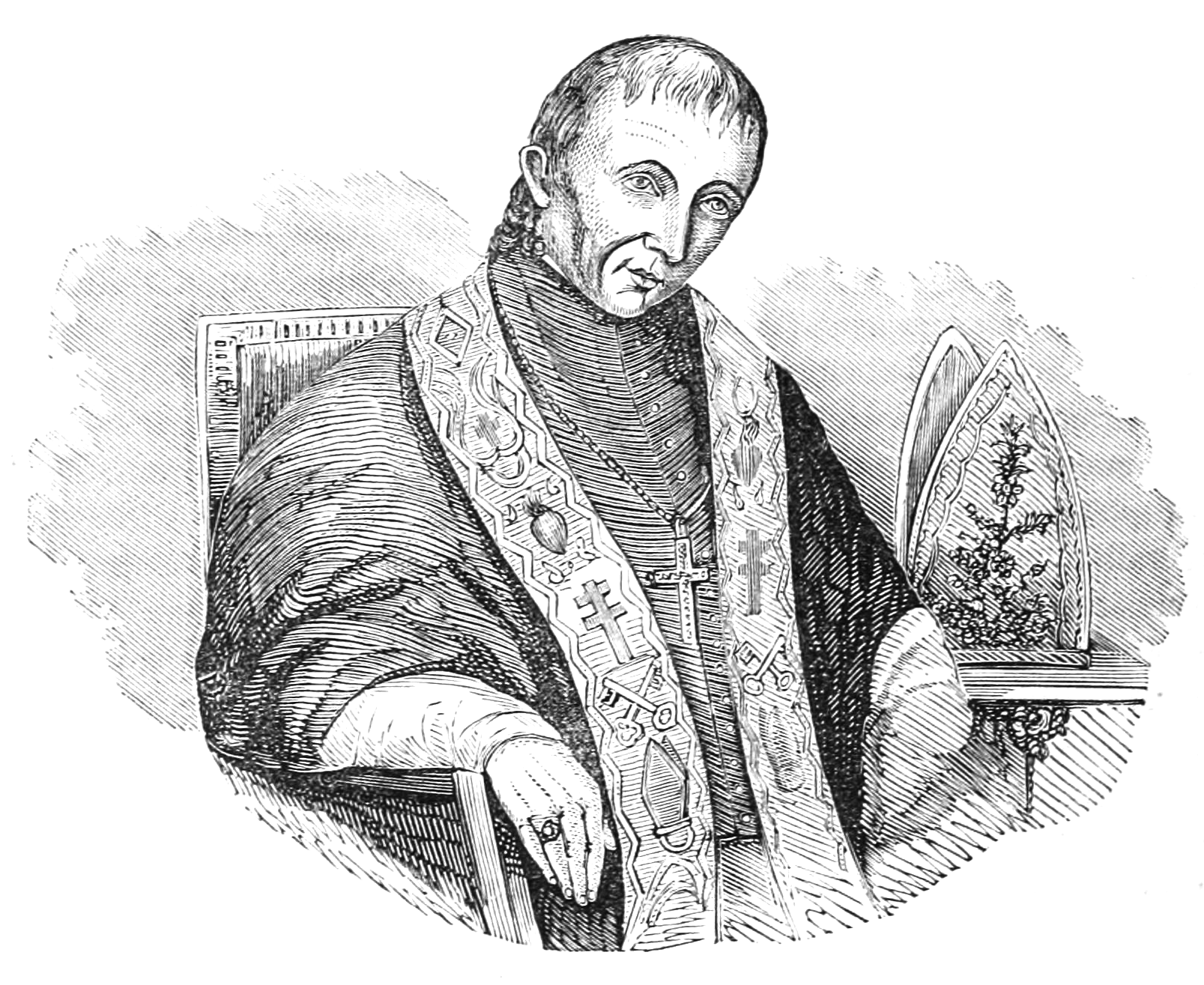
Archbishop Neale (1857)

When Carroll died, Neale automatically succeeded him as the second archbishop of Baltimore on December 3, 1815. He received the pallium from Pope Pius VII in 1816. Neale was age 70 when he became archbishop and his already fragile health had deteriorated further

One of Neale's first acts as archbishop was to request that Pius VII formally recognize the Visitation nuns' community. With the pope's approval, Neale officially recognized the community as the Georgetown Visitation Monastery. For this action, he is recognized as the founder of the institution.

=== Charleston schism ===
In 1813, Carroll assigned Reverend Pierre-Joseph de Clorivière as assistant pastor of St. Mary of the Annunciation Parish in Charleston, South Carolina, after receiving complaints from the parish about their pastor, Reverend Felix Gallagher. When Clorivière went to France to visit family and Gallagher left on a trip up north, Carroll brought in Reverend Robert Browne from Augusta, Georgia, to serve as interim pastor. When Clorivière returned to the United States in 1815, Carroll assigned him as permanent pastor of St. Mary's.

However, the trustees of St. Mary were offended that Carroll did not consult with them on the pastor's appointment. They also preferred an Irish priest to reflect the ethnic makeup of the parish. The board appointed Browne as pastor at St. Mary's and dismissed Clorivière, defying Neale, who was now archbishop. Gallagher argued that Neale had no authority to appoint a new pastor without his assent, and that doing so was causing a schism. In response, Neale suspend the priestly faculties of both Gallagher and Browne on February 21, 1816. Browne ignored Neale's order and resumed the pastorate at St. Mary's on March 28. Neale then placed St. Mary's under an interdict, prohibiting Catholic rites at the church

In May 1816, Browne traveled to Rome to appeal the interdict and his suspension to the Vatican. Cardinal Lorenzo Litta, the prefect of the Propaganda Fide, lifted the St. Mary's interdict and allowed Browne to remain as pastor there. Neale appealed Litta's decision to Pius VII, who reversed it on July 6, 1817, a few weeks after Neale's death. Clorivière, at his own request, was later assigned to the Visitation school in Washington as chaplain, Browne remained pastor at St. Mary's and the trustees submitted to the new archbishop's authority.

=== Death and legacy ===
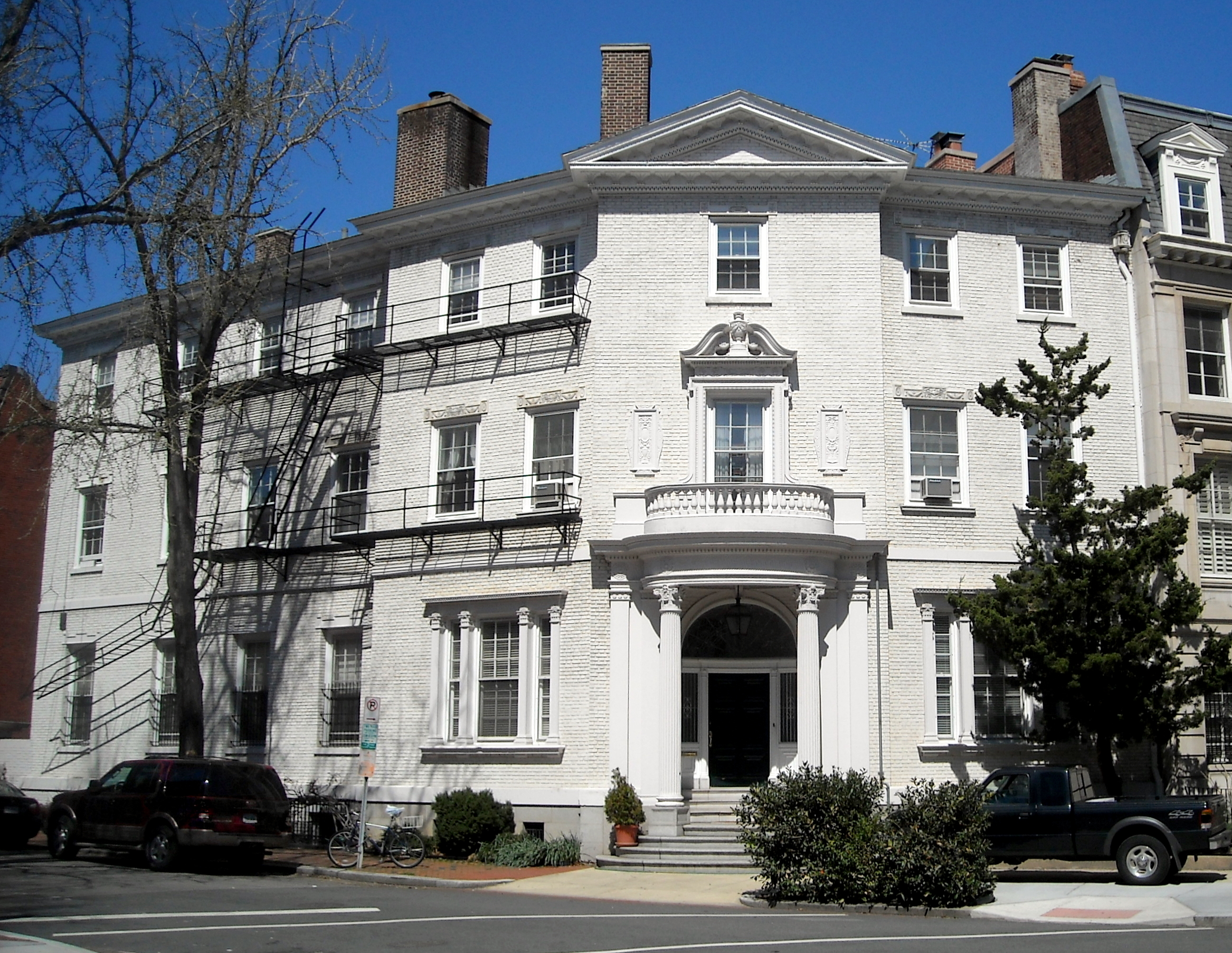
The Leonard Neale House, Washington D.C. (2009)

Due to his declining health, Neale requested that the Vatican appoint Bishop Jean-Louis Lefebvre de Cheverus as coadjutor archbishop of Baltimore to assist him. However, Cheverus, then bishop of the Diocese of Boston, did not want to leave Boston.

Leonard Neale died in Washington on June 18, 1817. Unaware of Neale's death, the Vatican named Reverend Ambrose Maréchal as coadjutor archbishop on July 24, 1817. Maréchal would ultimately succeed Neale as archbishop. Neale was buried in the crypt of the chapel at the Visitation Monastery.

- The Leonard Neale House in Washington served as the home of a Jesuit community from the 1960s until 2016, when the community merged with the Jesuits at Gonzaga College High School in Washington.
- The Archbishop Neale School in La Plata, Maryland, is named after Leonard Neale.

== See also ==
- Historical list of the Catholic bishops of the United States
- Catholic Church in the United States

== Informational notes ==
Catholic Church titles
Preceded by Dominic Lawrence Graessel	6th Pastor of Old St. Joseph's Church; 1793–1799	Succeeded by Matthew Carr
Preceded by Dominic Lawrence Graessel	Pastor of Old St. Mary's Church; 1793–1799	Succeeded by Matthew Carr
Preceded by —	Vicar General of the Diocese of Baltimore for Philadelphia; 1793–1799	Succeeded by —
Preceded by Jacques-Benjamin Longer	— TITULAR — Bishop of Gortyna; 1795–1815	Succeeded by Franciszek Zglenicki
Preceded by Dominic Lawrence Graessel	Coadjutor Bishop of Baltimore; 1795–1808	Succeeded by Himself as Coadjutor Archbishop
Preceded by Himself as Coadjutor Bishop	Coadjutor Archbishop of Baltimore; 1808–1815	Vacant Title next held by James Whitfield
Preceded by John Carroll	2nd Archbishop of Baltimore; 1815–1817	Succeeded by Ambrose Maréchal
Academic offices
Preceded by Louis Guillaume Valentin DuBourg	4th President of Georgetown College; 1798–1806	Succeeded by Robert Molyneux
