= Pratte =

Pratte is a surname. Notable people with the surname include:

- André Pratte (born 1957), Canadian journalist and politician
- Bernard Pratte (1803–1886), American politician
- Clara Pratte, American politician
- Diane Pratte (born 1953), Canadian alpine skier
- Henry Pratte (1788–1822), American Catholic priest
- Yves Pratte (1925–1988), Canadian lawyer and jurist

== See also ==
- Prette, another surname
