= Matthew Kelly (historian) =

Irish Roman Catholic priest, academic and antiquary

Matthew Kelly (21 September 1814 – 30 October 1858) was an Irish Roman Catholic priest, academic and antiquary.

== Life ==
Born at Kilkenny, he was eldest son of James Kelly, by Margaret Sauphy. An uncle, Patrick Kelly, was Bishop of Waterford. Kelly was taught in very early years by Michael John Brenan, author of the Ecclesiastical History of Ireland. When about seven years of age he entered the Kilkenny diocesan seminary, and in 1831 he began theological studies at Maynooth College, where he was elected a Dunboyne student in 1836.

From 1839 to 1841 Kelly was professor successively of philosophy and theology in the Irish College at Paris, and on 5 November 1841 was appointed to the chair of belles-lettres and French at Maynooth; on 20 October 1857 he became professor there of ecclesiastical history. In 1854 he was made D.D. by the pope, and about the same time a canon of Ossory. Kelly died on 30 October 1858, and was buried in the cemetery of Maynooth.

== Works ==
Kelly was a student of Irish antiquities and ecclesiastical history. He made large collections for a work on ‘The Ecclesiastical Annals of Ireland from the Invasion to the Reformation,’ as a continuation of the work of John Lanigan, and was superintending the publication of the ‘Collections on Irish Church History’ by Laurence Renehan. He edited John Lynch's ‘Cambrensis Eversus,’ Dublin, 3 vols. 1848–52 (for the Celtic Society, of whose council he was a member); Stephen White's ‘Apologia pro Hibernia,’ Dublin, 1849; and Philip O'Sullivan's ‘Historiæ Catholicæ Iberniæ Compendium,’ Dublin, 1850. He also translated Jean-Edmé-Auguste Gosselin's ‘Power of the Popes during the Middle Ages,’ London, 1853 (vol. i. of the ‘Library of Translations from Select Foreign Literature’), and published a ‘Calendar of Irish Saints, the Martyrology of Tullagh; with Notices of the Patron Saints of Ireland. And Select Poems and Hymns,’ Dublin, 1857.

Kelly contributed to various periodicals, notably the Dublin Review, and a collection of his essays, entitled ‘Dissertations chiefly on Irish Church History,’ was edited, with a memoir, by D. McCarthy, Dublin, 1864.
