= John Tessier =

French Sulpician priest (1758 to 1840)

John Tessier S.S. (1758-27 February 1840) was a French Sulpician priest who emigrated from France at the time of the Revolution. From 1810 to 1829 he was the Provincial Superior of the Sulpician congregation in the United States. He served as vicar-general to the Roman Catholic Bishops of Baltimore, and for a time oversaw both St. Mary's Seminary in Baltimore and Mount St. Mary's College and Seminary in Emmitsburg, Maryland.

== Life ==
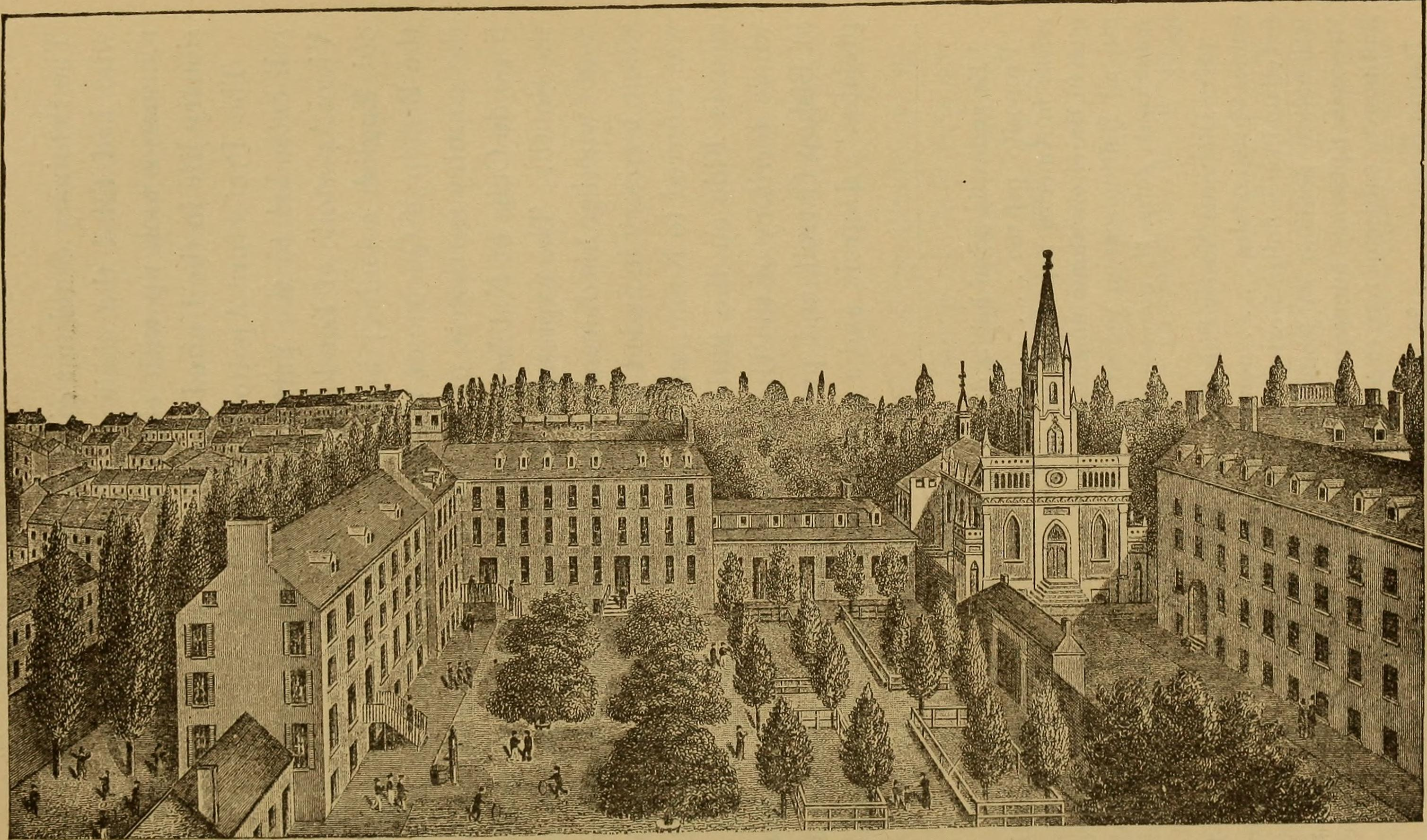
St. Mary's Seminary

Jean-Marie Tessier was born in 1758 in Chapelle-Blanche, France. Tessier had taught theology for two years at Viviers when, on April 8, 1791 John Tessier sailed for America from St. Malo, France in company with Francis Nagot S.S., Michael Levadoux, and A. Ganier, together with several seminarians. Given the threatening aspect of affairs in France, Rev. J. A. Emery, Superior-General of the Sulpicians, deemed it prudent to found a house of their institute in some foreign country, and at the suggestion of Cardinal Antonio Dugnani, nuncio at Paris, the United States was chosen. Negotiations were opened with the recently consecrated Bishop John Carroll of Baltimore, Maryland, and after some delay Rev. Nagot was named first director of a projected seminary, with Levadoux as treasurer. Also on the voyage was François-René de Chateaubriand.

The Sulpicians, fleeing the French Revolution, arrived in Baltimore on 10 July. They first lodged at 94 Baltimore Street but soon purchased the One Mile Tavern on the edge of the city, dedicated the house to the Blessed Virgin, and in October opened classes with five students whom they had brought from France. Called the Seminary of St. Sulpice (more commonly known as St. Mary's), this was the first American Roman Catholic seminary. That same year, Tessier attended the first synod of Baltimore. Bishop Carroll had opened an academy at Georgetown run by Jesuits in 1792, and some members of the Sulpician community sometimes taught there, as well as, undertaking parish duties.

Tessier taught theology at the Seminary and in 1810, succeeded Francis Nagot as superior of the Sulpician community in the United States, a position he held until 1829. In addition to his duties at the seminary, he served as Vicar General to the first four archbishops of Baltimore. He also ministered at St. Patrick's Church in Baltimore.

Tessier became the superior of St. Mary's Seminary in Baltimore and the effective superior of Mount St. Mary's College in Emmitsburg, Maryland. In 1826, the Sulpicians ceded their rights to the Emmitsburg college to John Dubois, the college's president, and his associates.

He worked closely with members of the St. Dominguan refugees, conducting catechism classes and ministering to the Afro-Haitian community that worshiped at St. Mary's Seminary Chapel. In 1827, Tessier directed fellow Sulpician James Nicholas Joubert to assume the duties of catechist in the Chappelle Basse (Lower Chapel). From this ultimately led to the foundation of the religious community of the Oblate Sisters of Providence.

Tessier died 27 February 1840 at the age of eighty-two. The archives of St. Mary's University contain one of his notebooks, listing events year by year from 1791 to 1830.
