= Prette =

Prette is a surname. Notable people with the surname include:

- Cristian Sánchez Prette (born 1985), Argentine footballer
- Louis Prette (born 1998), Monegasque-Italian racing driver

== See also ==
- Pratte, another surname
