= Jacques-André Emery =

French priest

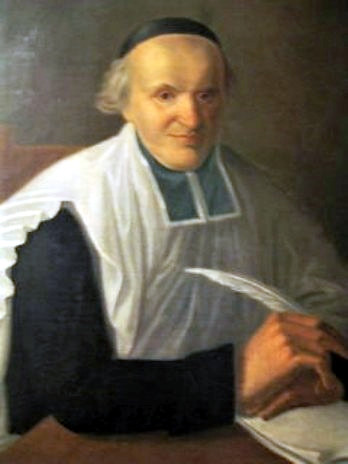
Jacques-André Emery

Jacques-André Emery (26 August 1732, Gex, Duchy of Savoy - 28 April 1811, Paris), France, was a French priest of the Society of Saint-Sulpice, who served as its Superior General during the French Revolution.

== Life ==
After Emery's preliminary studies with the Carmelites of his native town and the Jesuits of Mâcon, he entered the Seminary of St. Irenæus at Lyon and completed his studies at St-Sulpice, Paris, where he became a member of the society of that name and was ordained a priest in 1758.

In keeping with the Sulpician focus, Emery taught in the seminaries of Orléans and Lyon; at Lyon, he opposed the archbishop, Antoine de Montazet, who had strong Jansenist sympathies. Partly on the recommendation of the archbishop, he was made superior of the seminary at Angers in 1776, and later became Vicar General of that diocese. In 1782 he was elected Superior General of the Seminary and Society of St-Sulpice, for which he moved to Paris.

Emery reformed seminaries and worked for the training of clergy. After the French Revolution had commenced, he was, perhaps, during that period, the coolest head among the French Catholic ecclesiastics, and many came to him for advice. He was, says Catholic historian Sicard, "the head and the arm" of the party whose counsels were marked by moderation and good sense; "a man who was rarely endowed in breadth of learning, in knowledge of his time, in the clearness of his views, in the calmness and energy of his decisions; the oracle of the clergy, consulted on all sides less by reason of his high position than of his superior wisdom. M. Emery was called by Providence to be the guide throughout the long interregnum of the episcopate during the revolution" (L'Ancien Clergé;, III, 549). And Cardinal de Bausset declares that he was the "real moderator of the clergy during twenty years of the most violent storms".

The decisions of the Archiepiscopal Council at Paris concerning the several oaths demanded of the clergy, inspired by Emery, were accepted by large numbers of priests and violently assailed by others. To their acceptance was due whatever Catholic worship remained in France during the Revolution; to their rejection was due, in large part, the opinion which came to regard the clergy as "the irreconcilable enemies of the republic". Emery did not, like many others, mistake purely political projects for vital questions of religion. He felt free to take the "Oath of Liberty and Equality", but only as concerning the civil and political order. He upheld the lawfulness of declaring submission to the laws of the Republic (30 May 1795), and of promising fidelity to the Constitution (28 December 1799).

Emery lent his influence to Cardinal Giuseppe Spina in his efforts to obtain the resignation of the French bishops, in keeping with the will of Pope Pius VII (15 August 1801). While ready, for the good of Catholicism, to go as far as he believed the rights of the Catholic Church permitted, he was stanch in his opposition to the Civil Constitution of the Clergy (1790). Public religious services were suspended during the Revolution, and the seminaries closed; St-Sulpice was taken over by the revolutionists, and Emery was imprisoned and several times narrowly escaped execution.

The closing of the seminaries in France led Emery, upon the request of Bishop Carroll, to send some Sulpicians to the United States to found the first American seminary at Baltimore (St. Mary's, 18 July 1791). The future religion of the country, he wrote to Father Nagot, the first superior, depended on the formation of an American clergy, which alone would be adequate and fit for the work before it. Despite the discouragements of the first years, he continued the supporter of the institution and welcomed the foundation of the college at Pigeon Hill, and later at Emmitsburg, for young aspirants to the priesthood. At one time, however, Bishop Carroll feared the withdrawal of the Sulpicians, but his arguments and above all the advice of Pius VII convinced Emery that the good of religion in America required their presence.

After Napoleon came into supreme control, Emery re-established the Seminary of St-Sulpice. His defence of the pope against the emperor caused Napoleon to expel the Sulpicians from the seminary; this, however, did not daunt Emery, who defended the papal rights in the presence of Napoleon (17 March 1811) and gained the emperor's admiration, if not his good will. Sicard described him as "the only one among the clergy from whom Napoleon would take the truth'. He died a month later.

Emery was buried at the Sulpican cemetery adjacent to their seminary at Issy-les-Moulineaux. In 2013 his remains, along with those of 126 other members of the Society, were moved to a new site on the grounds of their retirement home in that same town.

== Works ==
Emery left many writings which have been published by Migne in his collection of theological works. They deal chiefly with the politico-religious questions of the day. He is best remembered, perhaps, by his dissertation on the mitigation of the sufferings of the damned. He wrote also on Descartes, Leibniz, and Francis Bacon, and published from their works extracts in defence of religion.

== Sources ==
- Jean-Edmé-Auguste Gosselin, Vie de M. Emery, 2 vols. (Paris, 1861–1862);
- Migne, Histoire de M. Emery et de l'eglise de France pendant la révolution et pendant l'empire, 2 vols. (Paris, 1895);
