= Dominic Laurence Graessel =

German-American Roman Catholic Jesuit (1753-1793)

The Right Reverend Dominic Laurence Grässel
- Coadjutor Bishop-elect of Baltimore
- Archdiocese: Archdiocese of Baltimore

Personal details
- Born: August 18, 1753 Bavaria, Germany
- Died: October 1793

Dominic Laurence Graessel, (Lorenz Grässel) (August 18, 1753 – October 1793) was an American Roman Catholic Jesuit. He was the first German-American to be appointed bishop.

== Biography ==
Lorenz Grässel was born at Ruhmannsfelden, Bavaria, on 18 August 1753. He joined the Society of Jesus in Munich and was a novice at the time of its suppression in 1773. He continued his studies at the Jesuit College of Ingolstadt and was ordained priest for the Archdiocese of Munich.

In 1781, Grässel left his native land for the American mission at the invitation of fellow Jesuit Ferdinand Steinmeyer, commonly referred to as "Father Farmer", who served areas of Pennsylvania, New Jersey, and New York. Sailing from London in August 1781, he arrived in America that October.

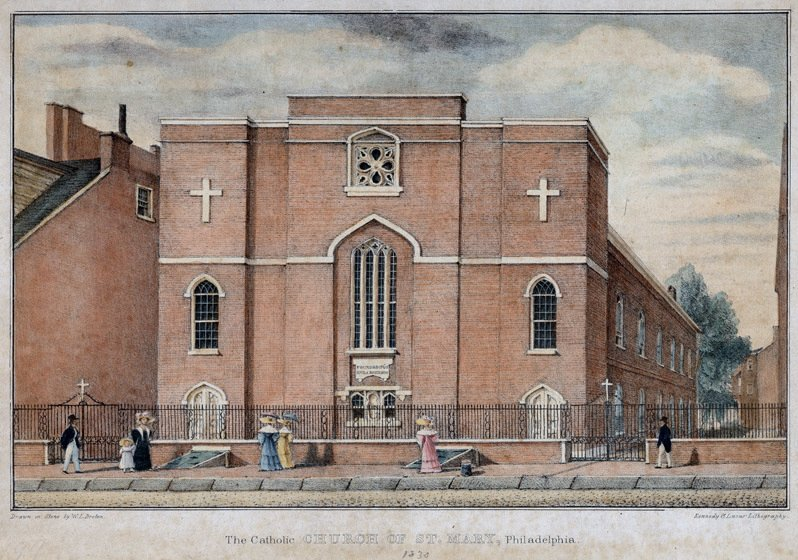
St. Mary's Church, Philadelphia lithograph 1829

In March 1787, Grässel was given charge of the German members of St. Mary's congregation in Philadelphia and of the Catholics scattered through New Jersey, all territories then within the Diocese of Baltimore. He spent six years in Philadelphia and became noted for his learning, zeal, and piety.

When it became necessary to appoint a bishop coadjutor to succeed John Carroll as bishop of Baltimore, the priests of the diocese chose Grässel for the office and the petition for his appointment was formally made to Rome on September 24, 1793. The petition was granted, making Grässel the first German-born Catholic appointed to a bishopric in the United States, though he was never consecrated a bishop. In October 1793 Grässel succumbed to yellow fever contracted while attending the victims of the plague which that year ravaged Philadelphia. The brief naming him titular bishop of Samosata did not arrive until December 8, 1793. News of his death did not reach the Vatican until July 1794.

Catholic Church titles
Preceded by Robert Molyneux	5th Pastor of Old St. Joseph's Church; 1788—1793	Succeeded by Leonard Neale
Preceded by Robert Molyneux	Pastor of Old St. Mary's Church; 1788—1793	Succeeded by Leonard Neale
New office	Coadjutor Bishop-elect of Baltimore	Succeeded by Leonard Neale
Preceded by Johann Ignace von Franken-Siersdorf	— TITULAR — Bishop-elect of Samosata	Succeeded by James O’Shaughnessy
