= Joseph Rosati =

Italian-born Catholic missionary

The Right Reverend Joseph Rosati C.M.
- Bishop of Saint Louis
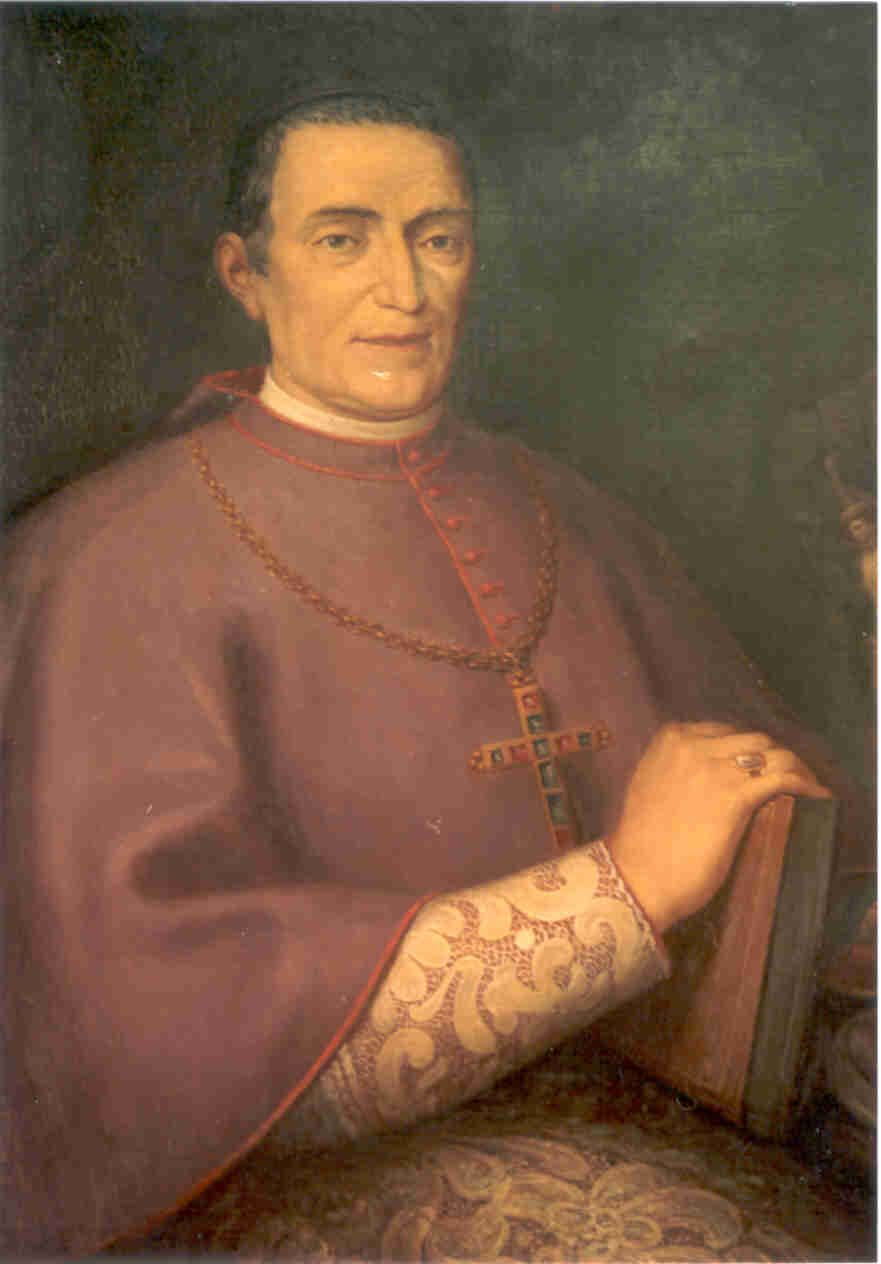
- Native name: Giuseppe Rosati
- See: Saint Louis
- Appointed: 20 March 1827
- Term ended: 25 September 1843
- Other posts: Titular Bishop of Tanagra, Greece (13 February 1822 – 19 March 1827); Vicar Apostolic of Mississippi and Alabama (13 August 1822 – 13 July 1823); Coadjutor bishop of the Diocese of Louisiana and the Two Floridas (14 July 1823 – 17 July 1826); Apostolic Administrator of the Diocese of New Orleans (18 July 1826 – 4 August 1829); Apostolic Administrator of the Diocese of St. Louis (18 July 1826 – 19 March 1827)

Orders
- Ordination: 10 February 1811
- Consecration: 25 March 1824 by Bishop Louis Dubourg, S.S.

Personal details
- Born: 12 January 1789 Sora, Campania, Kingdom of Naples
- Died: 25 September 1843 (aged 54) Montecitorio, Rome, Italy
- Buried: Basilica of St. Louis, King of France, St. Louis, Missouri, United States
- Denomination: Catholic Church

Joseph Rosati, CM (30 January 1789 – 25 September 1843) was an Italian-born Catholic missionary to the United States who served as the first bishop of the Diocese of Saint Louis in the Missouri Territory from 1826 to 1843. He built the first seminary and the first cathedral for the diocese. He also sent missionaries to areas such as Illinois, Arkansas and the Oregon Country.

A member of the Congregation of the Mission, in 1820 Rosati was appointed provincial superior, in charge of all Vincentian priests and seminarians in the United States. Rosati undertook a high-level diplomatic mission to Haiti in 1841 on behalf of the Vatican

== Early life ==
Joseph Rosati was born as Guiseppe Rosati on 30 January 1789 in Sora in the region of Campania, then part of the Kingdom of Naples. Having decided to become a priest, he entered his diocesan seminary in 1804. He completed his education there in 1807.

Due to the invasion of Naples by French forces under Napoleon Bonaparte, the Congregation of the Mission, known as the Vincentians, allowed Rosati to take his vows early in 1808. Rosati then went to Rome to study theology at the Vincentian center of Monte Citorio.

== Priesthood ==
=== Recruitment as missionary ===
Rosati was ordained a priest on 10 February 1811 in Rome by Bishop Giuseppe Bartolomeo Menocchio. While studying at Monte Citorio, Rosati started learning Hebrew. However, his Vincentian preceptor, Reverend Felix de Andreis, advised him to learn English instead.

In 1815, Reverend Louis Dubourg, the French apostolic administrator of Louisiana and the Two Floridas, was recruiting priests to come to the United States. His jurisdiction covered a vast area of the American South and Midwest. Although technically based in New Orleans, Dubourg had faced hostility from the clergy there. He then moved this base to St. Louis in the Missouri Territory. After arriving in St. Louis, the Catholic population of Perryville offered Dubourg 640 acres of land to build a church and seminary if he would recruit the priests for them. Accepting the offer, Dubourg travelled to Europe to find priests for this project.

While in Rome, Dubourg stayed at Monte Citorio. He persuaded the Vincentians to send some priests with him to the United States. De Andreis agreed to go and then convinced Rosati to join him. Before leaving Rome, Dubourg was consecrated as bishop of the Diocese of Louisiana and the Two Floridas.

=== Travel to the United States ===
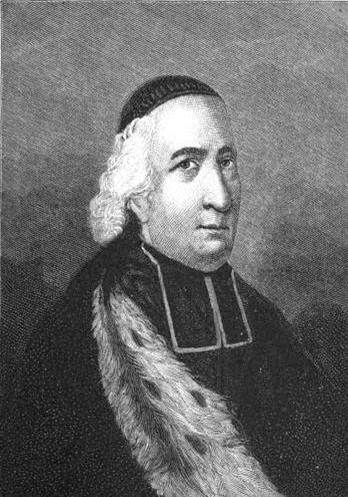
Archbishop Dubourg

In 1815, Dubourg, de Andreis and Rosati embarked from Bordeaux, France to Baltimore, Maryland, on the American brig Ranger. At that time, Baltimore was the center of Catholicism in the United States.

Rosati was severely ill during the entire 43-day voyage. After arriving in Baltimore, the men spent a month at the Sulpician seminary in Maryland to allow Rosati to recover. They then traveled to Pittsburgh, Pennsylvania, where they boarded a flatboat to go to Louisville, Kentucky. Their final stop was at St. Thomas Seminary in Bardstown, Kentucky.

The plan was for Dubourg to immediately return to France to recruit more priests and seminarians, leaving de Andreis and Rosati in Bardstown for a year to learn English. The two Italians taught theology at St. Thomas Seminary during 1816. During his stay at Bardstown, Rosati made a mission excursion to Vincennes in the new State of Indiana.

By 1817, Dubourg was ready to start the Perryville seminary. He asked Bishop Benedict Flaget of Bardstown to accompany Rosati and de Andreis on the 300 mile trip to St. Louis, Missouri. Once there, they would prepare for the arrival of Dubourg's party. Riding horseback, they traveled to Kaskaskia, Illinois, then crossed Mississippi River to reach Ste. Genevieve, a French Catholic community in the Missouri Territory. They were welcomed by Reverend Henry Pratte, the pastor in St. Genevieve. Leaving De Andreis to run the parish, Platte joined Flaget and Rosati for the last 63 miles to St. Louis.

The three clerics arrived in St. Louis to find St. Louis Church in terrible shape. The sanctuary and rectory were missing floors, windows, doors and furnishings. They were forced to sleep on the ground wrapped in buffalo robes. Dubourg landed in Baltimore in September 1817 with five priests and 25 future seminarians, then left for St. Louis. Rosati, Flaget and Platte made the rectory inhabitable before Dubourg's arrival. Wearing their full pontifical vestments, Dubourg and Flaget led a procession through St. Louis, greeted by the majority of the 2,500 occupants. They then proceeded to St. Louis Church, where Dubourg addressed the congregation for the first time.

=== St. Mary's of the Barrens ===
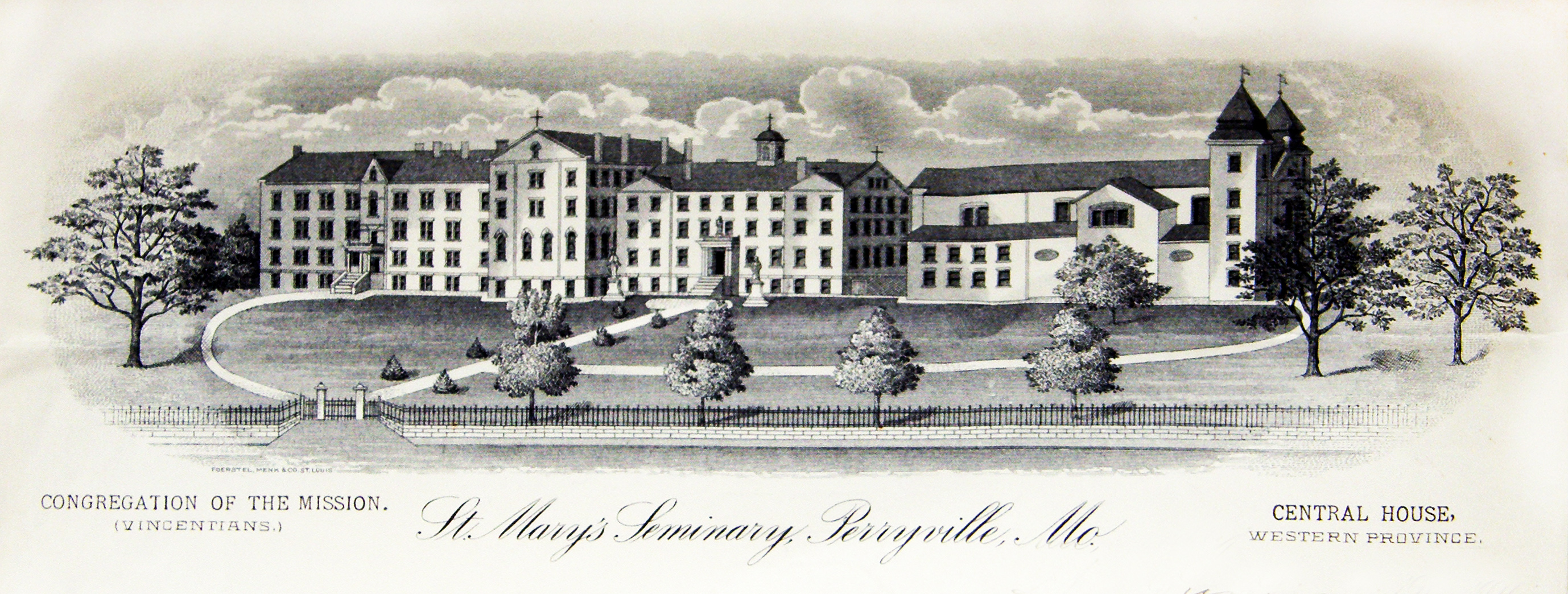
St. Mary's of the Barrens Seminary, Perryville, Missouri (1900)

In October 1818, Dubourg sent Rosati to Perryville to build the church and seminary that he had promised to the congregation three years early. Dubourg provided him with several enslaved individuals to aid in his construction projects; Rosati purchased more enslaved people in Perryville, bringing the total to 27 individuals.

Rosati immediately opened St. Mary of the Barrens Seminary in temporary quarters in Perryville. The name referred to the Barrens Colony, established by French Catholic missionaries in the area in late 18th century. Rosati's goal was to train new members for the Vincentian Society. He later opened St. Mary's College there to educate young men pursuing secular careers. Also in 1818, he began construction of the Assumption of the Blessed Virgin Mary Church in Perryville. A wooden structure, it was dedicated in 1820.

For several years, Rosait supervised the construction of St. Mary of the Barrens Seminary campus. During this period, he taught seminary classes and served as pastor at Assumption Parish. In 1820, the Vincentians appointed him to the additional duty as provincial superior in the United States.

== Episcopacy ==
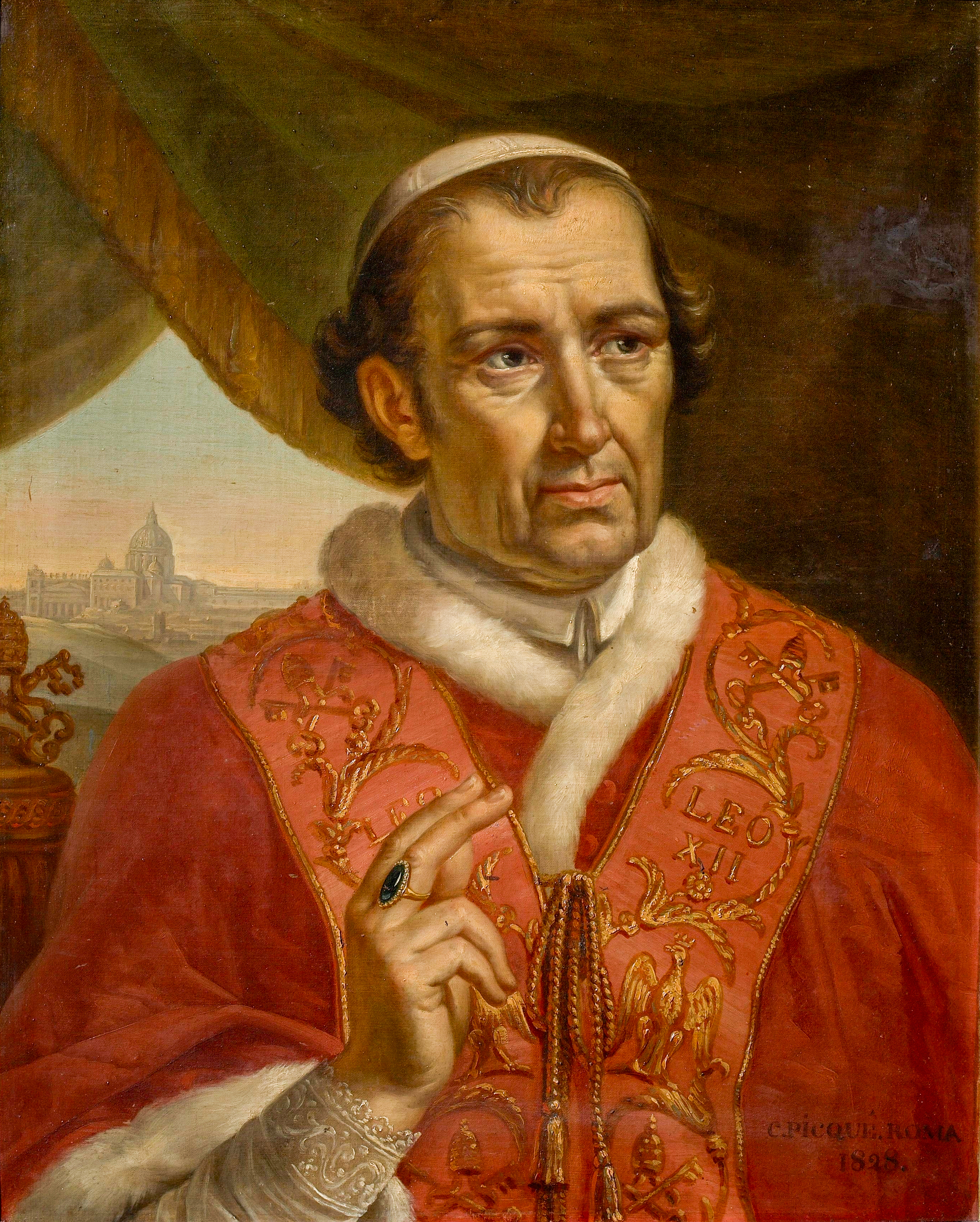
Pope Leo XII (1828)

=== Vicar Apostolic of Mississippi and Alabama ===
Pope Pius VII in February 1822 appointed Rosati as the titular bishop of Tanagra. He was consecrated by Dubourg at Ascension Church in Donaldsonville, Louisiana. Six months later, in August 1822, Pius VII erected the Vicariate Apostolic of Mississippi and Alabama and appointed Rosati as its vicar apostolic.

=== Coadjutor Bishop of Louisiana and the Two Floridas ===
In July 1823, when Dubourg requested a coadjutor bishop to assist him in New Orleans, Pius VII named Rosati.

In July 1826, during a trip to Rome, Dubourg asked Pope Leo XII for permission to immediately resign as bishop of the Diocese of Louisiana and the Two Floridas. Still in St. Louis, Rosati had no knowledge of Dubourg's plans. Rosati wrote, "I was absolutely bewildered and could not persuade myself it was true." Leo XII decided to divide the Diocese of Louisiana and the Two Floridas into the Diocese of New Orleans and the Diocese of St. Louis. He notified Rosati that he was now the apostolic administrator of both new dioceses.

=== Bishop of St. Louis ===
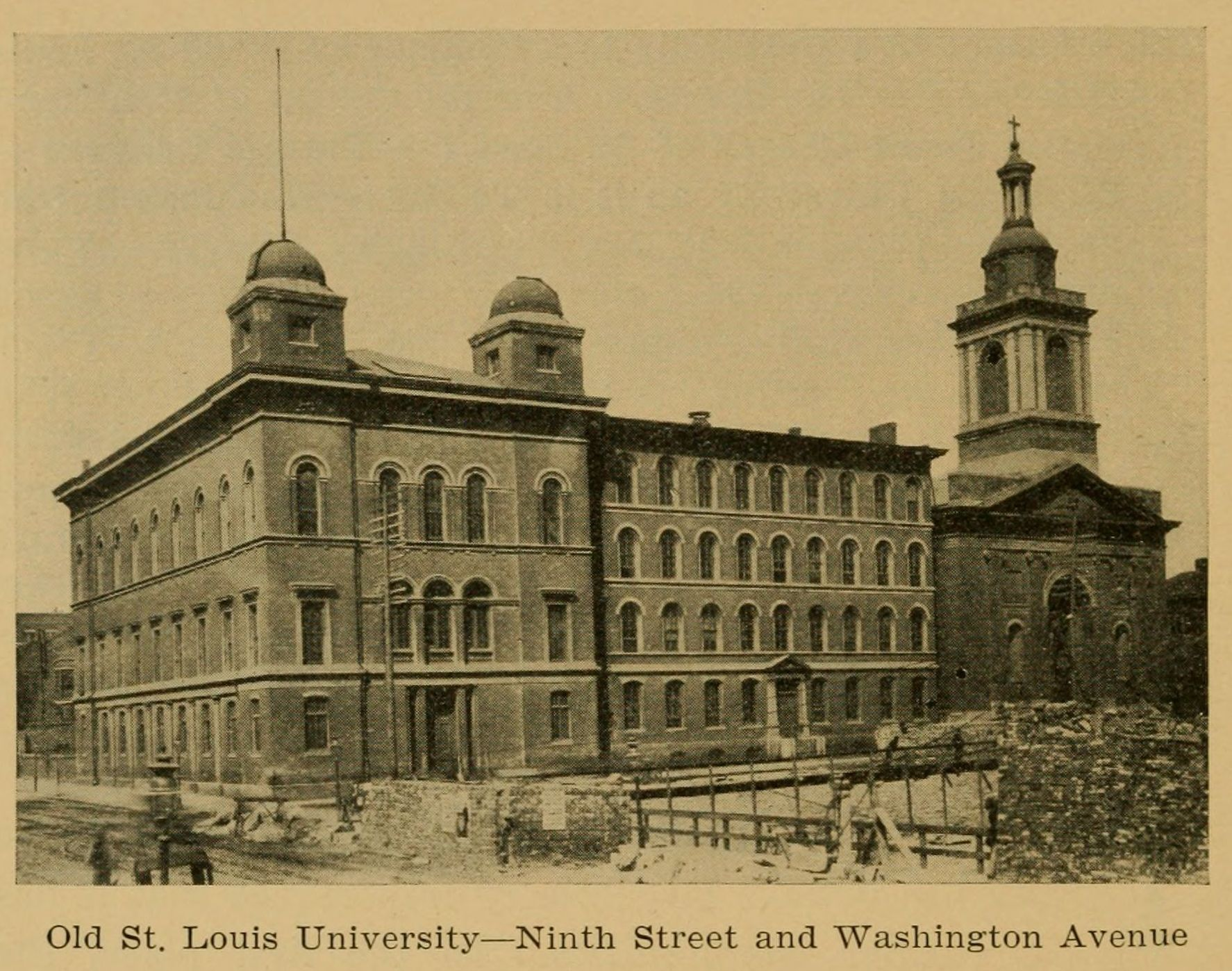
Saint Louis University, St. Louis, Missouri (1910)

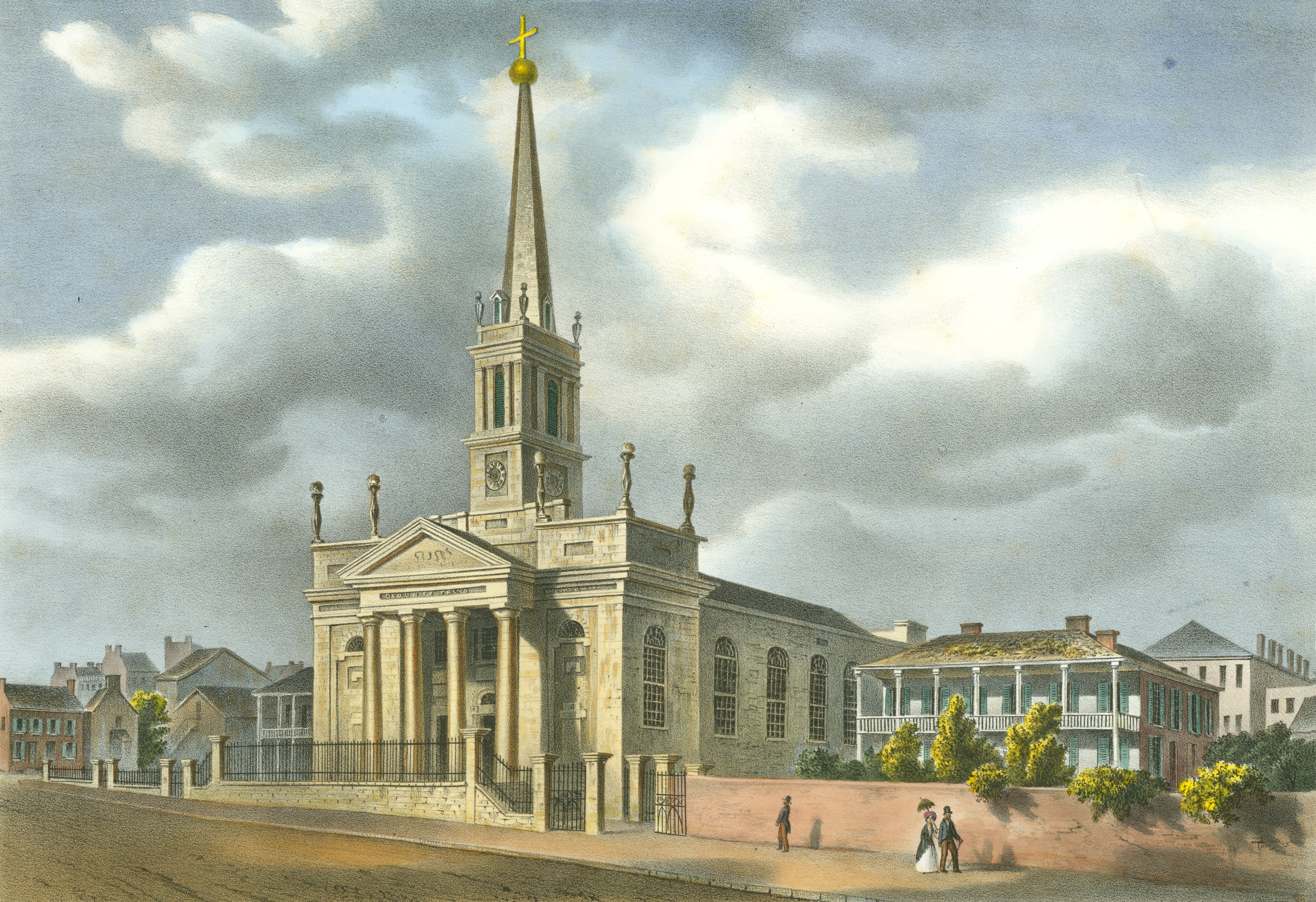
Basilica of St. Louis, King of France, St. Louis, Missouri (circa 1840)

Leo XII named Rosati as the first bishop of St. Louis on 20 March 1827.

As bishop, Rosati brought the Religious of the Sacred Heart Order to St. Louis to open parish schools. In 1827, Rosati invited the Society of Jesus to assume operation of St. Louis College; it became Saint Louis University in 1832. The Daughters of Charity of St. Vincent de Paul opened Mullanphy Hospital in Bridgeton in 1828; it is today SSM Health DePaul Hospital. Rosati travelled to Baltimore to attend the First Provincial Council, a meeting of bishops from the United States, in 1828.

In 1831, Rosati began construction of the first cathedral in St. Louis. It was dedicated in 1834 and is known today as the Basilica of St. Louis, King of France, or just as the Old Cathedral. That same year, the new building for St. Mary of the Barrens Seminary was completed.

Rosati sent Reverend John I. St. Cyr to establish the first parish in the growing city of Chicago. He also sent missionaries to Quincy, Illinois, Kansas City, Missouri, and Little Rock, Arkansas. When a contingent from the Nez Perce tribes in the Oregon Country came to St. Louis to ask for a priest, Rosati convinced the Jesuits to send one to them.

In 2010, the Archdiocese of St. Louis determined that Rosati sold "...my negro boy called Peter about nine or ten years old" to the Vincentian priest John Bouiller for $150 in 1830.

In the 1830s, as the Catholic population in the United States increased, nativist activists started promoting anti-Catholic propaganda. To help counter this in St. Louis, Rosati supported the creation of a Catholic newspaper, The Shepherd of the Valley.

Rosati attended the Fourth Provincial Council of Baltimore in May 1840. He then departed New York to visit Rome. He met twice with Pope Gregory XVI, who elevated him to the rank of assistant to the papal throne.

At this time, the pope enlisted Rosati to travel to the Republic of Haiti to meet with its government. Since the Haitian Revolution of 1791 to 1804, the Vatican had been attempting to establish diplomatic relations with different regimes there. After years of bloody warfare with the French and the British, the Haitians were distrustful of all Europeans. However, Gregory XVI had a high opinion of Rosati's abilities and knew that he could speak French, one of the languages of Haiti.

=== Apostolic Delegate to Haiti ===
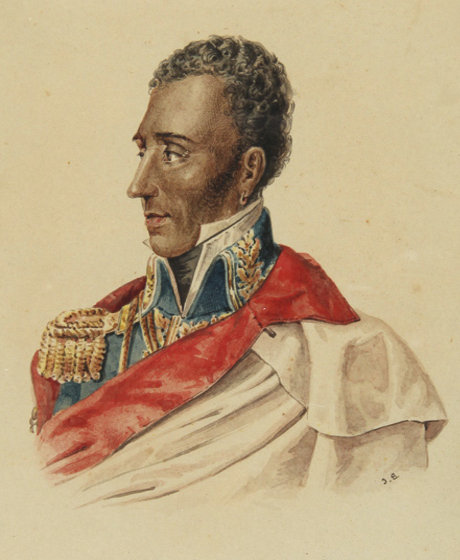
President Jean-Pierre Boyer (1825)

In August 1841, Rosati left France for Halifax in the British colony of Nova Scotia, then landed in Boston, Massachusetts. He then went to Philadelphia, where he participated in the consecration of Reverend Peter Kenrick to serve as his coadjutor bishop in St. Louis. In January 1842, Rosati sailed for Haiti on the brig William Nelson. As during his sea voyage in 1815, Rosati was sick the entire time.

Rosati arrived in Port-au-Prince at the end of January. Soon after arriving at his residence in the city, he was besieged by hundreds of Haitians seeking his blessing. A few days later, Rosati met with Jean-Pierre Boyer, the president of Haiti. In the meeting, Rosati emphasized that the Vatican had condemned the Atlantic slave trade and was welcoming to Black Catholics. Boyer agreed with Rosati that the clergy in Haiti needed more supervision that could be provided by the Vatican, and was impressed with Rosati himself. Boyer created a commission to reach an agreement with the Vatican. Having a signed agreement, Rosati left Haiti for France.

=== Final year ===
Rosati arrived in Brest, France, in March 1842. After spending several weeks in France recruiting priests for Haiti, he arrived back in Rome in April 1842. The Vatican was expecting Boyer to send his representatives to Rome, but they never arrived. In February 1843. The Vatican made plans to send Rosati back to Haiti, but his health was beginning to fail. He traveled from Rome to Paris, where he became incapacitated for two weeks. After learning that Boyer had just been removed from power, Rosati left Paris to return to Rome.

Rosati died on 25 September 1843 in Rome. His remains were returned to St. Louis for interment in the Basilica of St. Louis.

== Legacy ==
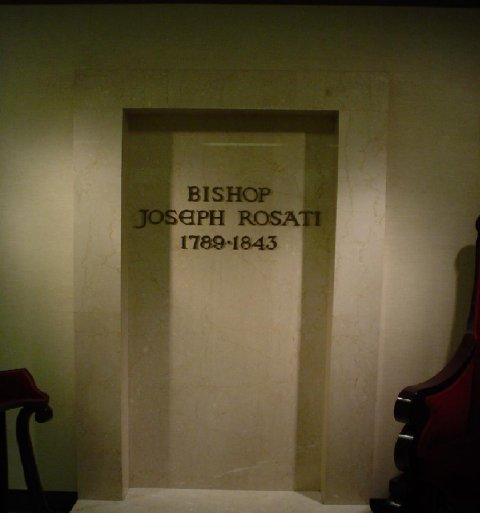
Tomb of Bishop Rosati, Basilica of Saint Louis, St. Louis, Missouri (2004)

In an 1888 publication, the historian John Gilmary Shea wrote about Rosati:

"Bishop Rosati was eminent for his holy life, his zeal as a priest, his successful administration as a bishop, his learning, his eloquence."

In a 1975 review essay, Reverend William Barnaby Faherty noted that Rosati was a warm, steady individual who was liked by his fellow clergy, religious sisters and people of all religious denominations.

Rosati-Kain Academy, originally Rosati-Kain High School, in St. Louis is named after Joseph Rosati.

== Sources ==
- Christensen, Lawrence O., et al. Dictionary of Missouri Biography. Columbia, MO:University of Missouri Press, 1997. ISBN 0-8262-1222-0
- Who Was Who in America:Historical Volume 1607–1896. Chicato:Marquis Who's Who, 1967.
- Archdiocese's research into history with slavery reveals three bishops, priests as slaveowners

Catholic Church titles
Preceded by none	Bishop of St. Louis; 1826–1843	Succeeded by Archbishop Peter Richard Kenrick
