= Henry Pratte =

First Catholic priest in the State of Missouri

Henry Platte (19 January 1788 – 1 September 1822) was an American minister who served as the first native Catholic priest in what is now the State of Missouri in the United States. He was curé of the Church of Ste. Genevieve in Ste. Genevieve, Missouri in 1815, and pastor from 1816 until his death from yellow fever in 1822.

== Life ==
Born in Ste. Genevieve, Missouri, which was founded as a settlement of French Louisiana, Henry Pratte was the son of John-Baptiste Sebastien Pratte by his second wife Marie Teresa Billeron. In 1803, he was sent to the Collège Saint-Raphaël in Montreal to complete his education, where he later entered the Grand Séminaire de Montréal to prepare for Holy Orders. He was ordained there, most likely by the Bishop of Quebec, Joseph-Octave Plessis.

Ste Genevieve had been without a pastor since the death of Rev. Joseph Maxwell in May 1814, from a fall from a horse. Wishing to serve in his home district, Pratte approached Benedict Joseph Flaget, Bishop of Bardstown, Kentucky, who, in October 1815, made Father Pratte curé of Ste. Genevieve and its dependent mission stations.

He was appointed pastor of the town in 1817 by the Rev. Louis Dubourg, S.S., Apostolic Administrator of the Diocese of Louisiana and the Two Floridas, which covered all the former Spanish and French territory by then within the United States. That same year, Pratt welcomed Bishop Flaget, and two Italian Vincentian priests, Felix de Andreis and Joseph Rosati, whom Dubourg had recruited to work in his vast diocese. He then accompanied them to St. Louis, where they were traveling to welcome Dubourg, who was returning from Europe after having been consecrated a bishop. Pratte's house was the common stopping place for all priests who passed through town on their way to other parts of the diocese.

Pratt returned to his post in Ste. Genevieve, where, in addition to his pastoral duties, he worked to revive the school he had himself attended, Ste. Genevieve Academy, which his predecessor had founded. To this end, he petitioned Dubourg for the assignment of one of the Brothers of the Christian Schools who had come with the bishop from France. One, Brother Antonin, was assigned to teach at the Academy, becoming the first member of his religious institute to teach in the United States.

Pratte is credited with building a church in Saint Michel, a village of about 100 people. Saint Michel was founded by French Creoles of the Illinois Country with roots in Canada and a few native French who had lived for some time in the valley. The village was located on the Saline Creek. The settlers worked in smelting lead. St. Michael's Church was a small frame hut, plastered and with a bell, and was the pride of the small congregation. It replaced the original log church after the settlement was nearly destroyed by a flood in June 1814.

Pratte died in Ste. Genevieve from yellow fever on 1 September 1822, at the age of thirty-four and is buried beneath the sanctuary floor of Ste. Genevieve Catholic Church.
