= John Lynch (Gratianus Lucius) =

Irish Roman Catholic priest

John Lynch (pseudonym: Gratianus Lucius; c. 1599 – c. 1677) was an Irish Roman Catholic priest, known as a historian and Archdeacon of Tuam.

== Life ==
He was born into a Hiberno-Norman family at Galway, probably in 1599; according to tradition his father was Alexander Lynch, a schoolmaster. He was educated by the Jesuits, and became a secular priest about 1622. He celebrated Mass in secret, and in private houses; and kept a school.

He was appointed archdeacon of Tuam, and lived in the old castle of Ruaidrí Ua Conchobair. He was a friend of Dubhaltach Mac Fhirbhisigh. On the surrender of Galway to the New Model Army in 1652 he left for France; some of his works were printed at St. Malo. Lynch died in France.

== Works ==
He was the author of:

- A translation into Latin of Geoffrey Keating's ‘History of Ireland,’ manuscript.
- ‘Cambrensis Eversus, sive potius Historica Fides in Rebus Hibernicis Giraldo Cambrensi abrogata; in quo plerasque justi historici dotes desiderari, plerosque nævos inesse, ostendit Gratianus Lucius, Hibernus, qui etiam aliquot res memorabiles Hibernicas veteris et novæ memoriæ passim e re nata huic operi inseruit. Impress. An. MDCLXII’ [St. Malo?]. Dedicated to Charles II. Translated from the Latin, with notes and observations by Theophilus O'Flanagan, Dublin, 1795. Lynch defends the cessation of 1643, the peace of 1646 and 1648, condemns the nuncio, and approves the general policy of Ormonde. An edition of this work, with an English translation and notes, by Matthew Kelly, was printed for the Celtic Society, 3 vols. Dublin, 1848–52.
- ‘Epistle to M. Boileau, Historian of the University of Paris, on the subject of Scottish Antiquities,’ 1664. Printed in Roderic O'Flaherty's ‘Ogygia vindicated,’ Dublin, 1775.
- ‘Alithinologia, sive veridica Reponsio [sic] ad Invectivam, Mendaciis, falaciis, calumniis, & imposturis fœtam in plurimos Antistites, Proceres, & omnis ordinis Hibernos a R. P. R[ichardo] F[erral] C[appucino] Congregationi de Propaganda Fide, Anno Domini 1659, exhibitam. Eudoxio Alithinologo authore. Impress. An. MDCLXIV’ [St. Omer?]
- ‘Supplementum Alithinologiæ, quod partes invectivæ in Hibernos cusæ in Alithinologia non oppugnatas evertit’ [St. Omer?] 1667, 4to. This and the preceding treatise attacked Richard Ferral, an Irish Capuchin friar, who had in 1658 presented a disloyal piece in manuscript to the Congregatio de Propaganda Fide as a direction for them in the government of church affairs in Ireland, tending to renew the divisions between the ‘meer antient Irish’ and the English-Irish settled there since the reign of Henry II. Ferral's composition was entitled ‘Ad Sacram Congregationem de Propagandâ Fide. Hic authores et Modus eversionis Catholicæ Religionis in Hiberniâ recensētur, et aliquot remedia pro conservandis reliquiis Catholicæ Religionis et Gentis proponuntur.’
- Latin poem, written about 1667, in reply to the question ‘Cur in patriam non redis?’ Edited by James Hardiman, and printed in the ‘Miscellany of the Irish Archæological Society,’ i. 90–8.
- ‘Pii Antistitis Icon, sive de Vita et Morte Rmi D. Francisci Kirovani, Alladensis Episcopi,’ St. Malo, 1669. This life of Francis Kirwan, who was Lynch's uncle, was reprinted at Dublin in 1848, with a translation and notes by Charles Patrick Meehan, who published a second edition in 1884.

== Sources ==
- John Lynch of Galway (c. 1599-1677): his career, exile and writing, by Rene d’Ambrieres & Eamon Ó Ciosáin, in Journal of the Galway Archaeological and Historical Society, Vol. 55, 2003.
- The Tribes of Galway:1124-1642, Adrian Martyn, Galway, 2016.
