= Philip O'Sullivan Beare =

Irish author (1590–1660)

Philip O'Sullivan Beare (Irish: Pilib Ó Súilleabháin Béirre, c. 1590–1636) (Note: While a number of sources (including Webb's 1878 Compendium of Irish Biography) suggest that Philip O'Sullivan Beare died in 1660, this is questioned by several sources (including in Byrne's 1903 translation of Ireland under Elizabeth). The Oxford Dictionary of National Biography suggests that O'Sullivan Beare died "in or after 1634". The Dictionary of Irish Biography states that he died in 1636.) was a military officer descended from the Gaelic nobility of Ireland, who became more famous as a writer. He fled to Habsburg Spain during the time of Tyrone's Rebellion, when the Irish clans and Gaelic Ireland were making their last stand against the Tudor conquest of Ireland. He subsequently authored the book, the Catholic History of Ireland, which offered a history from the perspective of the native Irish Catholic population.

== Biography ==
Philip O'Sullivan Beare was born in Dursey in County Cork, the son of Dermot O'Sullivan and nephew of Donal Cam O'Sullivan Beare, Prince of Beare. The O'Sullivans owned and controlled much of the Beara Peninsula and Valentia Island in south-western Ireland.

Sent to Spain in 1602, Philip O'Sullivan Beare was educated at Compostela by Vendamma, a Spaniard, and John Synnott, an Irish Jesuit. He served in the Spanish army.

In 1621, he published his Catholic History of Ireland, a work which is described as "deliberately polemical", and in the Catholic Encyclopedia as "not always reliable, but valuable for the Irish wars of the author's own day". He also wrote a Life of St. Patrick (in 1629), a confutation of Gerald of Wales and a reply to James Usher's attack on his History.

He died in Spain c. 1636. In a letter from Peter Talbot he was described as the "Earl of Birhaven" who left "daughter of twelve years to inherit his titles in Ireland and his goods".

== Works ==
Works written by O'Sullivan Beare include:

- O'Sullivan Beare, Philip, Historiae Catholicae Iberniae. Spain. 1621. Edited by Matthew Kelly 1850, Dublin: Printed by John O'Daly. Portion translated into English by Matthew J. Byrne 1903, titled Ireland under Elizabeth, and also Chapters towards a History of Ireland in the reign of Elizabeth. Dublin: Sealy, Bryers & Walker.
- O'Sullivan Beare, Philip, Zoilomastix. Spain. 1625. Translated into English by Denis O'Sullivan 2009, titled The Natural History of Ireland. Cork: Cork University Press.
