= Jean-Edmé-Auguste Gosselin =

French Catholic priest and author

Jean-Edmé-Auguste Gosselin (28 September 1787 at Rouen, France – 27 November 1858 at Paris) was a French Catholic priest and ecclesiastical author.

== Life ==
Gosselin studied philosophy and theology at St-Sulpice, Paris from 1806 to 1811; became professor of dogma, while yet a subdeacon, after the expulsion of the Sulpicians from the seminary by Napoleon in 1811; and was ordained a priest in 1812. On the return of the Sulpicians (1814) he entered their society, and served as vice-president of the seminary at Issy from 1814 to 1830, professor of theology to the candidates for the society from 1814 to 1818, and superior of the seminary from 1831 to 1844, when the state of his health, which had always been delicate, obliged him to resign.

Ernest Renan, in his Lettres du Séminaire, describes Gosselin as kind, gentle, pious, prudent, and erudite. Later, in Souvenirs d'enfance et de jeunesse, Renan says of Gosselin: "He was the most polished and amiable man whom I have ever known."

== Works ==
Gosselin left major three works. The first is the standard edition of Fénelon in twenty-two volumes (1820–24), to which he added his correspondence in eleven volumes (1827–29), besides a corrected and enlarged edition of Bausset's "Histoire de Fénelon" and other smaller works devoted to the Archbishop of Cambrai. Gosselin's edition is valuable for its notes and discussions, but its accuracy was somewhat marred by his partiality for Fénelon.

Out of this grew Gosselin's best-known work, Pouvoir du Pape au moyen âge (1839; 2nd edition, 1845; tr. as "The Power of the Popes during the Middle Ages", Baltimore, 1853). In part superseded by Louis Duchesne's researches, it argued that the popes exercised temporal power over sovereigns during the Middle Ages. Orestes Brownson, in several articles devoted to it, while admitting its great erudition, attacked its position (adopted from Fénelon), that this power was derived not from divine authority, but from the public law of that period.

Finally, Gosselin lived to complete his Vie de M. Emery which was revised and published (1861) after his death.
