= Francis Charles Nagot =

French Catholic priest (1734–1816)

Francis Charles Nagot (1734–1816) was a French Catholic priest who worked for the Society of Saint-Sulpice. He founded two Catholic teaching establishments in Baltimore in the United States.

He was born at Tours on April 19, 1734. He joined the congregation of the priests of Saint-Sulpice. He gained a doctorate in theology from the University of Nantes and was sent as professor of theology to the Seminary of Nantes. He was made superior of the small seminary, then director of the large seminary.

The French Revolution led to his travelling to the US in 1791 and establishing St. Mary's, the first Catholic seminary and college in Baltimore. He died in Baltimore on April 9, 1816.

== Publications ==
- Relation de la conversion de quelques Protestants (1791)
- La Doctrine de l'Ecriture sur les miracles (1808, a translation of an English work by George Hay)
- Vie de, M. Olier, cure de Saint-Suilpice (1813)

and several translations of works of English piety.
