= St Michael and All Angels Church =

St Michael and All Angels Church may refer to:

== Africa ==
- St Michael and All Angels Church, Blantyre Malawi
- St. Michael and All Angels' Anglican Church, Weltevreden Park, Johannesburg, South Africa
- St. Michael and All Angels in the Anglican Diocese of Cape Town (observance of Anglo-Catholic rites of the Oxford Movement tradition), Observatory, Cape Town, South Africa.

== Asia ==
- St. Michael's and All Angels' Church, Oorgaum, KGF, India
- St Michael and All Angels Church, Polwatte, Colombo, Sri Lanka
- Regal Parish and National Shrine of Saint Michael and the Archangels, Manila, Philippines

== Europe ==
=== Ireland ===
- Church of St Michael and All Angels, Millicent, County Kildare

=== England ===
- St Michael and All Angels Church, Caldecote, South Cambridgeshire
- St Michael and All Angels Church, Hawkshead, Cumbria
- St Michael and All Angels' Church, Hathersage, Derbyshire
- St Michael and All Angels Church, Littlebredy, Dorset
- St Michael and All Angels Church, Galleywood Common, Essex, a church designed by James Piers St Aubyn
- St Michael's and All Angels Church, Guiting Power, Gloucestershire
- Church of St Michael and All Angels, Swanmore, Ryde, Isle of Wight
- St Michael and All Angels Church, Maidstone, Kent
- St Michael and All Angels Church, Headingley, Leeds
- St Michael and All Angels Church, Edmondthorpe, Leicestershire
- St Michael and All Angels' Church, Woodchurch, a listed building in Woodchurch, Merseyside

==== Buckinghamshire ====
- St Michael and All Angels Church, Aston Clinton
- St Michael and All Angels Church, Hughenden
- St Michael and All Angels' Church, Thornton

==== Cheshire ====
- St Michael and All Angels Church, Little Leigh
- St Michael and All Angels Church, Macclesfield
- St Michael and All Angels Church, Marbury
- St Michael and All Angels, Middlewich
- St Michael and All Angels Church, Crewe Green

==== Cornwall ====
- St Michael and All Angels Church, Bude
- St Michael and All Angels Church, Latchley
- St Michael and All Angels Church, Penwerris

==== Devon ====
- St Michael and All Angels Church, Mount Dinham, Exeter
- St Michael and All Angels' Church, Heavitree, Exeter
- St Michael and All Angels' Church, Alphington, Exeter, a notable building in Alphington
- St Michael and All Angels' Church, Pinhoe, a 15th-century church overlooking the Exeter village of Pinhoe

==== Greater Manchester ====
- St Michael and All Angels' Church, Ashton-under-Lyne
- St Michael and All Angels' Church, Howe Bridge
- St Michael and All Angels Church, Mottram
- Church of St Michael and All Angels, Northenden
- Church of St Michael and All Angels, Wigan

==== Hampshire ====
- St Michael and All Angels Church, Bassett
- St Michael and All Angels Church, Lyndhurst, Hampshire
- St Michael and All Angels Church, Highclere

==== Herefordshire ====
- Belmont Abbey, Herefordshire, Abbey Church of St Michael and All Angels, Hereford
- Church of St Michael and All Angels, Kingsland
- Church of St Michael and All Angels, Ledbury
- St Michael and All Angels Church, Moccas

==== Lancashire ====
- St Michael and All Angels Church, Altcar
- St Michael and All Angels Church, Ashton-on-Ribble, Preston

==== London ====
- St Michael and All Angels Church, Barnes
- St Michael and All Angels, Bedford Park
- St Michael & All Angels, Enfield
- St Michael and All Angels Church, Wood Green

==== Northumberland ====
- Church of St Michael and All Angels, Felton
- St Michael and All Angels Church (Howick, Northumberland)

==== Nottinghamshire ====
- Church of St Michael and All Angels, Averham
- Church of St Michael and All Angels, Bramcote
- St Michael and All Angels' Church, Elton on the Hill
- Church of St Michael and All Angels, Underwood

==== Shropshire ====
- St. Michael & All Angels, Chetwynd, Shropshire
- St Michael and All Angels' Church, Welshampton
- St. Michael & All Angels, Wentnor, Shropshire

==== Somerset ====
- Church of St Michael & All Angels, Greinton
- Church of St Michael and All Angels, Puriton
- Church of St Michael and All Angels, Somerton

==== Sussex ====
- St Michael and All Angels Church, Brighton, East Sussex
- St Michael and All Angels Church, Lowfield Heath, Crawley, West Sussex
- St Michael and All Angels Church, Southwick, West Sussex
- St Michael and All Angels Church, Withyham, East Sussex

==== Warwickshire ====
- St Michael and All Angels Church, Brownsover
- St Michael & All Angels Church, Wood End

==== West Midlands ====
- St Michael and All Angels' Church, Bartley Green, Birmingham,
- St Michael & All Angels Church, Pelsall

==== Worcestershire ====
- St Michael and All Angels, Broadway, Worcestershire
- St Michael and All Angels' Church, Cofton Hackett
- St Michael and All Angels, Great Witley, Worcestershire
- Church of St Michael and All Angels, Martin Hussingtree
- Church of St Michael and All Angels, Stourport
- Church of St Michael and All Angels, Tenbury Wells

==== Yorkshire ====
- Church of St Michael and All Angels, Beckwithshaw, North Yorkshire
- St Michael and All Angels Church, Spennithorne, North Yorkshire
- St Michael and All Angels Church, Great Houghton, South Yorkshire
- St Michael and All Angels' Church, Haworth, West Yorkshire
- St Michael's and All Angels Church, Thornhill, West Yorkshire
- St Michael and All Angels' Church, Downholme

=== Scotland ===
- St Michael & All Angels, Inverness

=== Wales ===
- Church of St Michael and All Angels, Forden, Powys
- Church of St Michael and All Angels, Gwernesney, Monmouthshire
- St Michael and All Angels Church, Llanfihangel Rogiet, Monmouthshire
- St Michael and All Angels, Mitchel Troy, Monmouthshire

== North America ==
- Cathedral Church of Saint Michael and All Angels, Bridgetown, Barbados
- St. Michael and All Angels Episcopal Church (Anniston, Alabama), U.S.
- St. Michael and All Angels Episcopal Church, formerly Grace Church (Cincinnati, Ohio), U.S.

== Oceania ==
- St Michael and All Angels Church, Kingaroy, Queensland, Australia
- Church of St Michael and All Angels, Christchurch, New Zealand

== See also ==
- Michaelion, a sanctuary dedicated to Archangel Michael
