= St Michael and All Angels =

St Michael and All Angels may refer to:

- Michaelmas, a saints day in the Christian calendar
- St Michael and All Angels Church (disambiguation) — various churches of that name
- Community of St. Michael & All Angels, a religious order in South Africa
