= List of town halls in India =

This is a list of town halls in India.

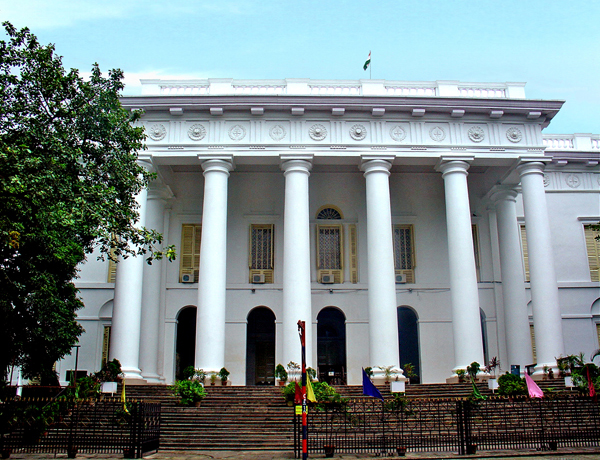
Kolkata Town Hall

- Asansol Town Hall
- Bhopal Town Hall
- Bangalore Town Hall
- Chennai Town Hall
- Chandigarh Town Hall
- Delhi Town Hall
- Kolkata Town Hall
- Kanpur Town Hall
- King George Hall
- King Edward Memorial Hall
- Mumbai Town Hall
- Shimla Town Hall
