= N. G. Hulkur =

- village
- Location in Karnataka, India N. G. Hulkur (India)
- Coordinates: 13.00515354588687°N 78.42969808594049°E
- Country: India
- State: Karnataka
- District: Kolar
- Taluk: Kolar Gold Fields

Government
  - Type: Panchayati raj (India)
  - Body: Gram panchayat

Population
  - Total: 2,432

Languages
  - Official: Kannada
- Time zone: UTC+5:30 (IST)
- PIN: 563116
- Telephone code: 08153
- ISO 3166 code: IN-KA
- Vehicle registration: KA
- 2011 census code: 622772
- Website: karnataka.gov.in

N. G. Hulkur is a village in the Kolar Gold Fields Taluk of Kolar district in Karnataka, India. It is situated about 25 kilometers from Kolar Gold Fields, situated very close to Andhra Pradesh border.

== Demographics ==
According to the 2011 Indian Census, the village consists of 2,432 people. The town has a literacy rate of 52.71 percent which is lower than Karnataka's average of 75.36 percent.

Total Number of Household : 561
Population	Persons	Males	Females
Total	2,432	1,270	1,162
In the age group 0–6 years	285	154	131
Scheduled Castes (SC)	1,358	706	652
Scheduled Tribes (ST)	0	0	0
Literates	1,282	768	514
Illiterate	1,150	502	648
Total Worker	1,293	692	601
Main Worker	1,288	688	600
Marginal Worker	5	4	1
Non Worker	1,139	578	561
