= St. Patrick's Catholic Church (Washington, D.C.) =

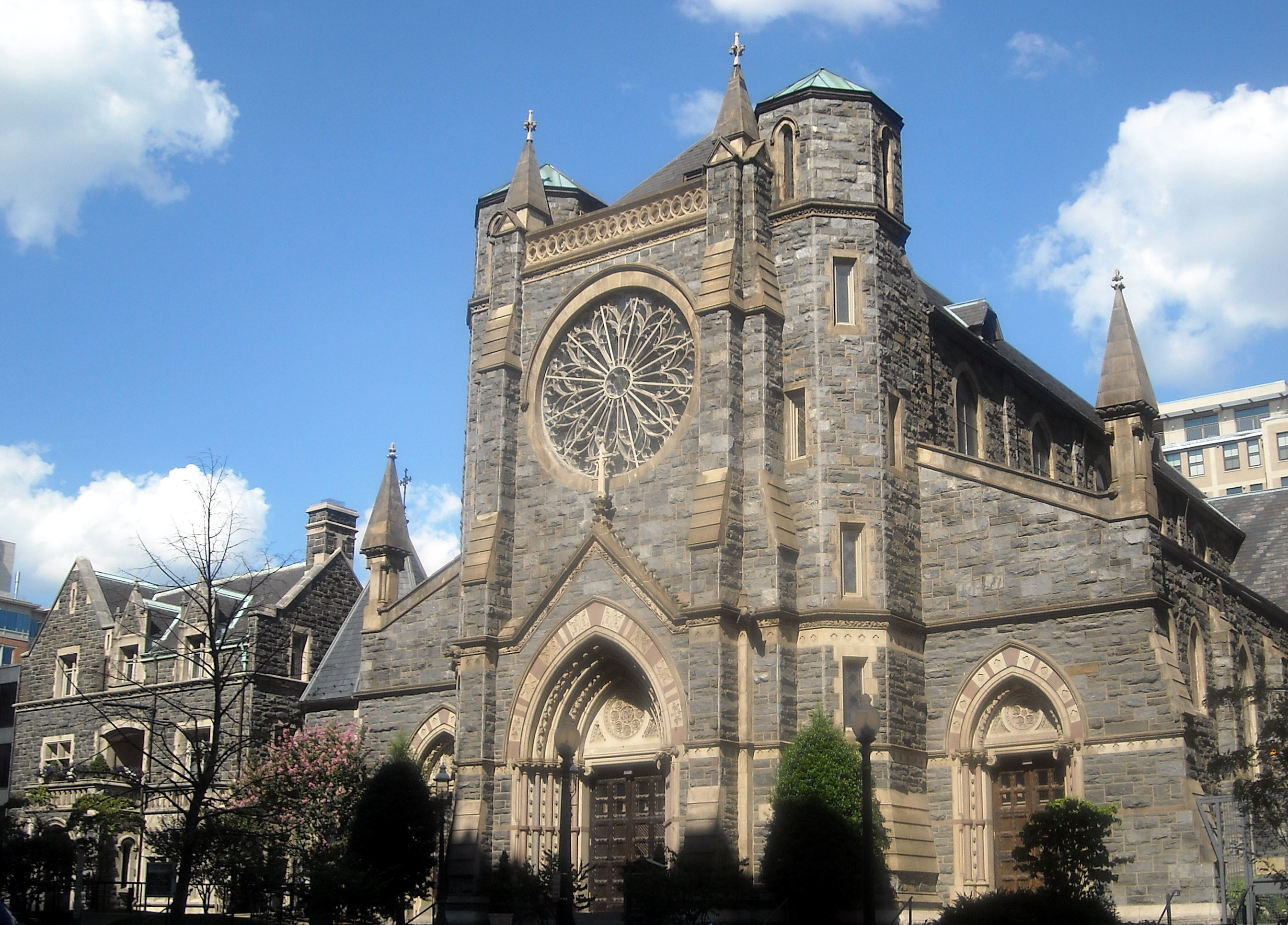
- St. Patrick's Catholic Church
- St. Patrick's Catholic Church
- 38°53′52.5″N 77°01′32.1″W
- Location: 619 10th St NW, Washington, D.C.
- Country: United States
- Denomination: Catholic Church
- Sui iuris church: Latin Church
- Website: saintpatrickdc.org

History
- Founded: 1794
- Founder: Anthony Caffry

Administration
- Archdiocese: Washington

St Patrick's Catholic Church is a Catholic parish in Washington, District of Columbia, United States of America. Established in 1794, it is the oldest Catholic parish in the city of Washington.

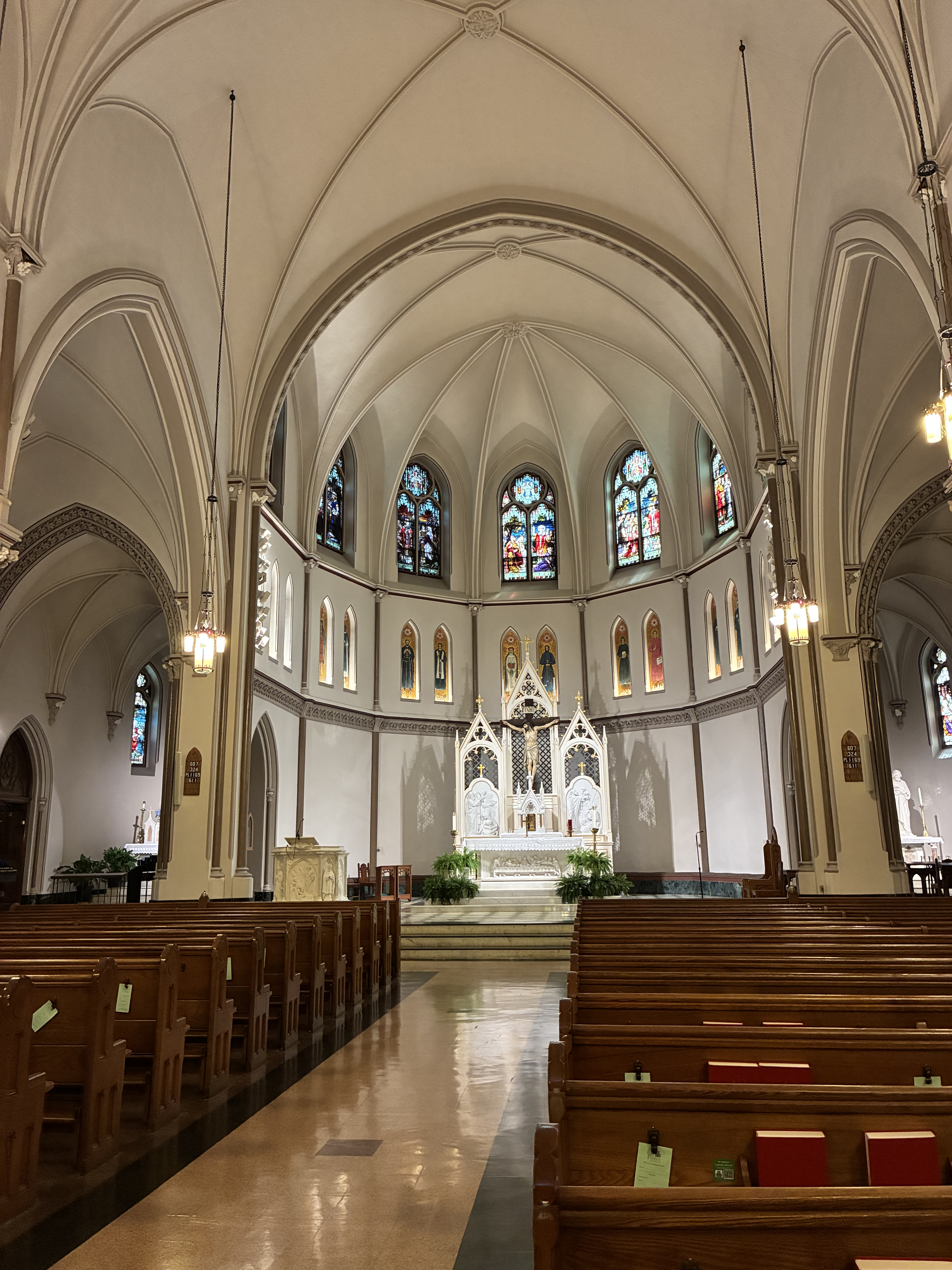
Interior view

== History ==
St. Patrick's Catholic Church was founded in 1794 to serve the Irish immigrants to the United States who worked as stonemasons during the construction of the White House and the U.S. Capitol. Dominican priest Anthony Caffry O.P., recently arrived from County Mayo, Ireland, was charged by Bishop John Carroll with establishing the first Roman Catholic parish in the City of Washington. Caffry's decision to undertake the project was likely influenced by Irish architect James Hoban, one of the supervising architects on the Capitol building. Hoban asked Caffry to consider the Irish stone workers building the new federal capital. Caffrey first began celebrating Mass in rented spaces in the beginning of the year, but later built a modest, one-and-a-half story wood-frame church with the meager funds the parish had.

Caffrey resigned in 1804 and was reassigned to New York. He was followed by William Matthews who oversaw construction of a new, larger church in 1809 on the site of the original building. The brick, Gothic Revival church was completed in 1816. This new St. Patrick's was consecrated by Archbishop John Carroll, and the Mass was concelebrated by coadjutor Bishop Leonard Neale, Matthews' maternal uncle.

During the War of 1812, British troops invaded Washington, D.C., in 1814. As they advanced to within two blocks of St. Patrick's Church, fire from surrounding buildings spread to the roof of St. Patrick's. Matthews barricaded himself and others inside the sanctuary while most of the city's population fled. He went to the roof to put out the fire, then persuaded General Robert Ross not to destroy the church.

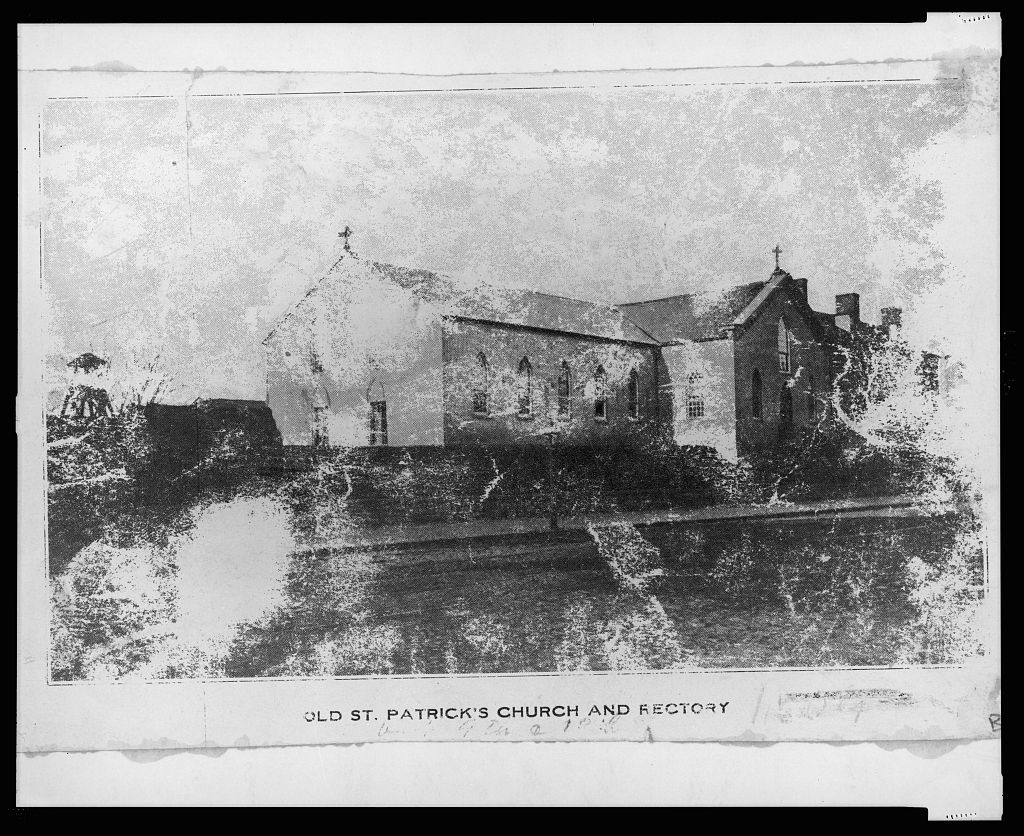
The second St. Patrick's Church between 1890 and 1910

In 1825, Matthews founded the St. Vincent's Female Orphan Asylum and brought the Daughters of Charity of St. Vincent de Paul from Emmitsburg, Maryland, to run it. Mother Juliana, the local superior, was Matthews' niece. Matthews was pastor from 1804 until his death in 1854.

Rev. Timothy O'Toole, an Irish immigrant who had attended seminary of St Patrick's College, Maynooth in Ireland, was pastor from 1854 to 1860. During his tenure, he founded the Father Mathew Total Abstinence society, the parochial school, and St. Joseph's Orphan Asylum for Boys. O'Toole was followed by Jacob Ambrose Walter, who, in November 1872, saw the cornerstone laid for the new church. The first mass was said in the new church on November 2, 1884. It was dedicated on December 28, 1884.

The church is a contributing property to the Downtown Historic District, which is listed on the National Register of Historic Places (NRHP). Radical renovations to the sanctuary in 1994 witnessed the removal and subsequent destruction of the church's original high altar, communion rail, consecration stones, and some artwork. The National Park Service, which oversees the NRHP, considered taking formal, perhaps legal, action over the unprecedented violation of regulation.

Pope Francis visited Saint Patrick's Church on September 24, 2015, during his tour of the United States.

== Blue Mass ==
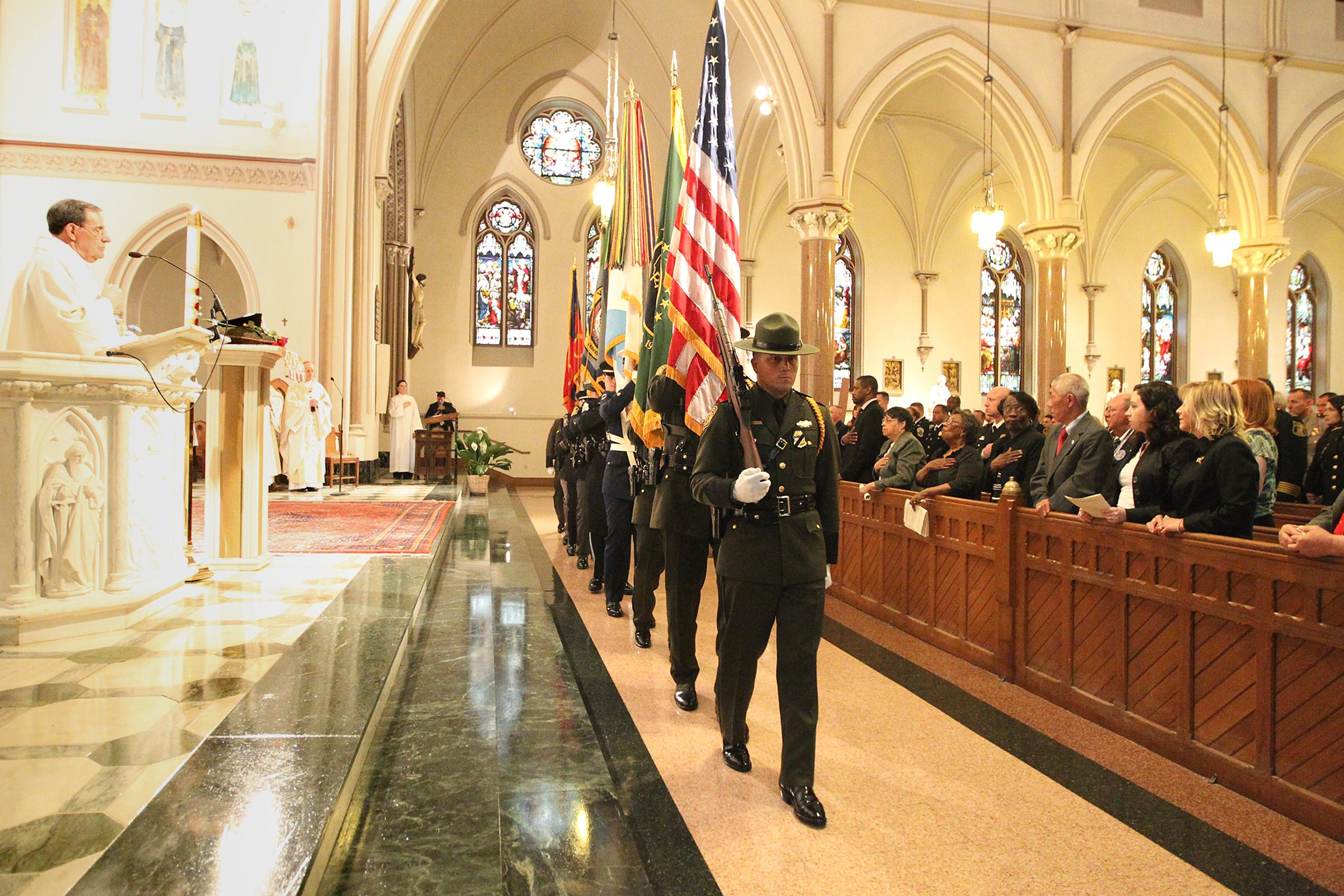
Blue mass at St. Patrick's in 2013

The Blue Mass dates to September 29, 1934, when Rev. Thomas Dade started the celebration as part of his duties with the Catholic Police and Fireman's Society.

Rev. Dade's brother was a policeman in Baltimore, which boasted a healthy Catholic Police and Fireman's Society. Rev. Dade noticed that there was no such fraternal association in Washington, DC, and lobbied the Washington, DC, commissioners to allow him to create one. The Washington, DC, branch of the CPFS was opened in 1934.

That first Mass has grown to a nationwide celebration. The September 29 celebration was timed to coincide with Michaelmas, the feast of Saint Michael the Archangel, the patron military saint of police officers and military.
