= King George Hall =

King George Hall may refer to:

- King George Hall, Colombo, a theatre of the University of Colombo
- King George Hall, Kolar Gold Fields, India, a town hall
- King George's Hall, Blackburn, England
