= Greinton =

Village in Somerset, England

Coordinates: 51.123°N 2.841°W

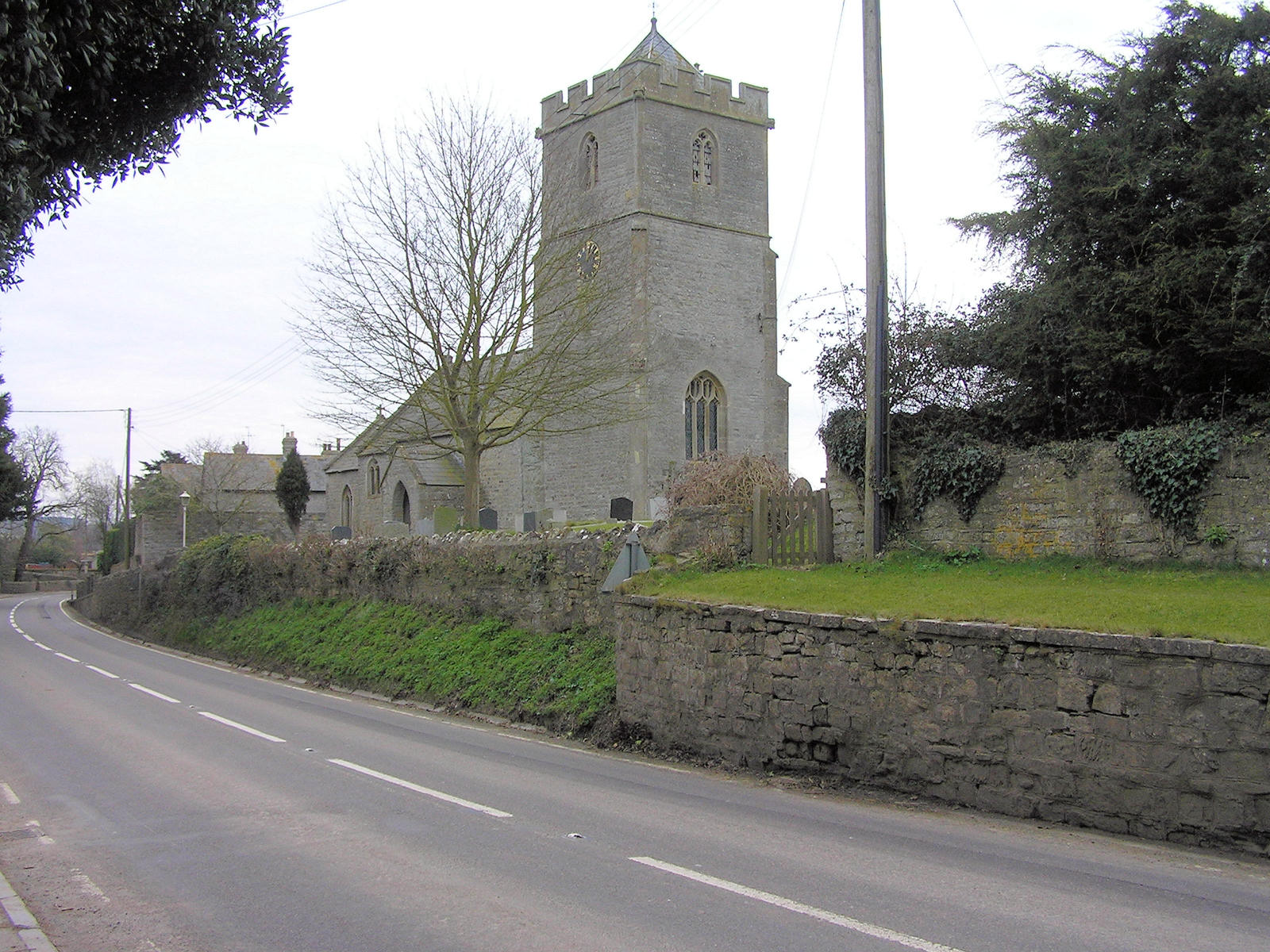
- Greinton Church of St. Michael and All Angels

- Location within Somerset
- Population: 193 (2011)
- OS grid reference: ST411364
- Unitary authority: Somerset Council
- Ceremonial county: Somerset
- Region: South West
- Country: England
- Sovereign state: United Kingdom
- Post town: BRIDGWATER
- Postcode district: TA7
- Dialling code: 01458
- Police: Avon and Somerset
- Fire: Devon and Somerset
- Ambulance: South Western
- UK Parliament: Wells and Mendip Hills

Greinton is a village and civil parish in Somerset, England, situated on the Somerset Levels and Moors at the foot of the Polden Hills, 9 kilometres (5.6 mi) west southwest of Glastonbury and 7 miles (11 km) east of Bridgwater.

== History ==
The parish of Greinton was part of the Whitley Hundred.

The village straddles the A361 Glastonbury - Taunton road, which bends around in two sharp corners through the village. The ancient road was known as altera strata in the early 14th century—an alternate route to the Polden road perhaps.

Archeological evidence points to Roman occupation, including a burial site, but most of Greinton's older houses date to the 19th century. A housing estate of semi-detached homes and barn conversions has been built in the 20th and 21st centuries. Greinton Manor may have been part of the Pouelt estate granted to Glastonbury abbey in 729. Records trace the Manor's tenants, transfers, sales and inheritance through the 11th century up to its subdivision and sales in the 1950s.

In 2007 the publication Digital Spy said Heather Mills joined animal welfare activists from the Viva! organization as they trespassed on Briarwood Farm in Greinton in order to film the treatment of pigs in farrowing crates.

== Governance ==
The parish council has responsibility for local issues, including setting an annual precept (local rate) to cover the council's operating costs and producing annual accounts for public scrutiny. The parish council evaluates local planning applications and works with the local police, district council officers, and neighbourhood watch groups on matters of crime, security, and traffic. The parish council's role also includes initiating projects for the maintenance and repair of parish facilities, as well as consulting with the district council on the maintenance, repair, and improvement of highways, drainage, footpaths, public transport, and street cleaning. Conservation matters (including trees and listed buildings) and environmental issues are also the responsibility of the council.

For local government purposes, since 1 April 2023, the village comes under the unitary authority of Somerset Council. Prior to this, it was part of the non-metropolitan district of Sedgemoor, which was formed on 1 April 1974 under the Local Government Act 1972, having previously been part of Bridgwater Rural District.

It is also part of the Wells and Mendip Hills county constituency represented in the House of Commons of the Parliament of the United Kingdom. It elects one Member of Parliament (MP) by the first past the post system of election, and was part of the South West England constituency of the European Parliament prior to Britain leaving the European Union in January 2020, which elected seven MEPs using the d'Hondt method of party-list proportional representation.

== Religious sites ==
Parts of Greinton's St Michael and All Angels Church date to the 12th century, with evidence that it may have been built on a pre-Christian site. It has been designated as a Grade I listed building. Refurbished in the 14th, 15th and 16th centuries, the church seems to have been led by a cast of colorful clergy, dating at least to 1259 when Boniface de Foliano was rector.

In 1397 the rector was accused of attacking the vicar of Pawlett during mass and extorting money and livestock from him . . . John Hyne, rector 1584-1624, was in prison in 1590, leaving the church unserved. . . In the 1600s Hyne was presented for minor infringements such as allowing a girl of 12 to be a godmother. He also refused a couple communion and accused the wardens of buying watered wine.

The tower, which dates from the 15th century, has a ring of six bells, including a medieval Bristol bell, bells dated 1586,1707, 1788, and two dated 1899. Major repairs and renovations were carried out in the Victorian era, including the addition of stained glass and a north porch, and the conversion of the south porch to a vestry. Incomplete records in the church register go back to 1655, with complete records from 1777.
