= Government First Grade College, Kolar Gold Fields =

Coordinates: 12.95701091191718°N 78.27787794924507°E

Government First Grade College is a college in the Kolar Gold Fields.

The college opened in the year 1962. It is located in the heart of the city of Kolar Gold Fields and is affiliated to Bangalore University. It offers undergraduate programmes in Arts, Commerce, Management and Science. It has total students strength comprising both boys and girls around 750.

It was the first government degree college in and around the city of Kolar Gold Fields. The Government First Grade College provides a solution to the poor and needy students of Kolar Gold Fields and its surrounding villages with affordable fees.
