= Palar Nagar =

Palar Nagar Palar Nagar
- village
- Location in Karnataka, India Palar Nagar (India)
- Coordinates: 12°59′47.6″N 78°14′19.6″E
- Country: India
- State: Karnataka
- District: Kolar

Government
  - Body: Gram panchayat

Population
  - Total: around 300

Languages
  - Official: Kannada
- Time zone: UTC+5:30 (IST)
- PIN: 563115
- Telephone code: 08153
- ISO 3166 code: IN-KA
- Vehicle registration: KA-08
- Nearest city: Kolar Gold Fields
- Literacy: more than 80%%
- Climate: Summer ranges Max-34 Min-24, Winter ranges Max-26 Min 12 (Köppen)
- Website: karnataka.gov.in

Palar Nagar is a village situated in Kolar Gold Fields of Kolar district of Karnataka State in India. It is near Aalamaram.
