= Bharat Gold Mines Limited =

Gold Mines Company

Bharat Gold Mines Limited or in short BGML was a public sector undertaking of the Government of India. It owns Kolar Gold Fields.

== History ==
Bharat Gold Mines Limited (BGML) was a public sector undertaking of the Government of India incorporated in 1972 under the Ministry of Mines to manage and operate the Kolar Gold Fields (KGF) in Karnataka.

BGML was one of India’s principal gold producers and a major employer in the KGF region. However, increasing operational costs, declining ore grades, and the technical challenges of deep-level mining adversely affected production and profitability.

In early 1990s, the company had incurred substantial financial losses and was referred to the Board for Industrial and Financial Reconstruction (BIFR) after its net worth became negative. Efforts to revive the company through restructuring and technological upgrades did not yield sustainable results.

In 2001, the Government of India ordered the closure of BGML’s mining operations under the Industrial Disputes Act, citing unviable operations and mounting losses. Gold mining activities at Kolar Gold Fields formally ceased in March 2001.

The closure had significant socio-economic consequences for the KGF region, leading to large-scale unemployment and prolonged disputes over wages, pensions, and settlement benefits. Former employees and trade unions periodically sought intervention from the central government to address pending claims.

In the years following its closure, BGML remained under liquidation proceedings, and its legacy continued to influence policy discussions concerning mining sector reforms and the future of Kolar Gold Fields. The site remains historically significant as one of India’s oldest gold mining regions.
