= Blue Mass =

Catholic mass for first responders

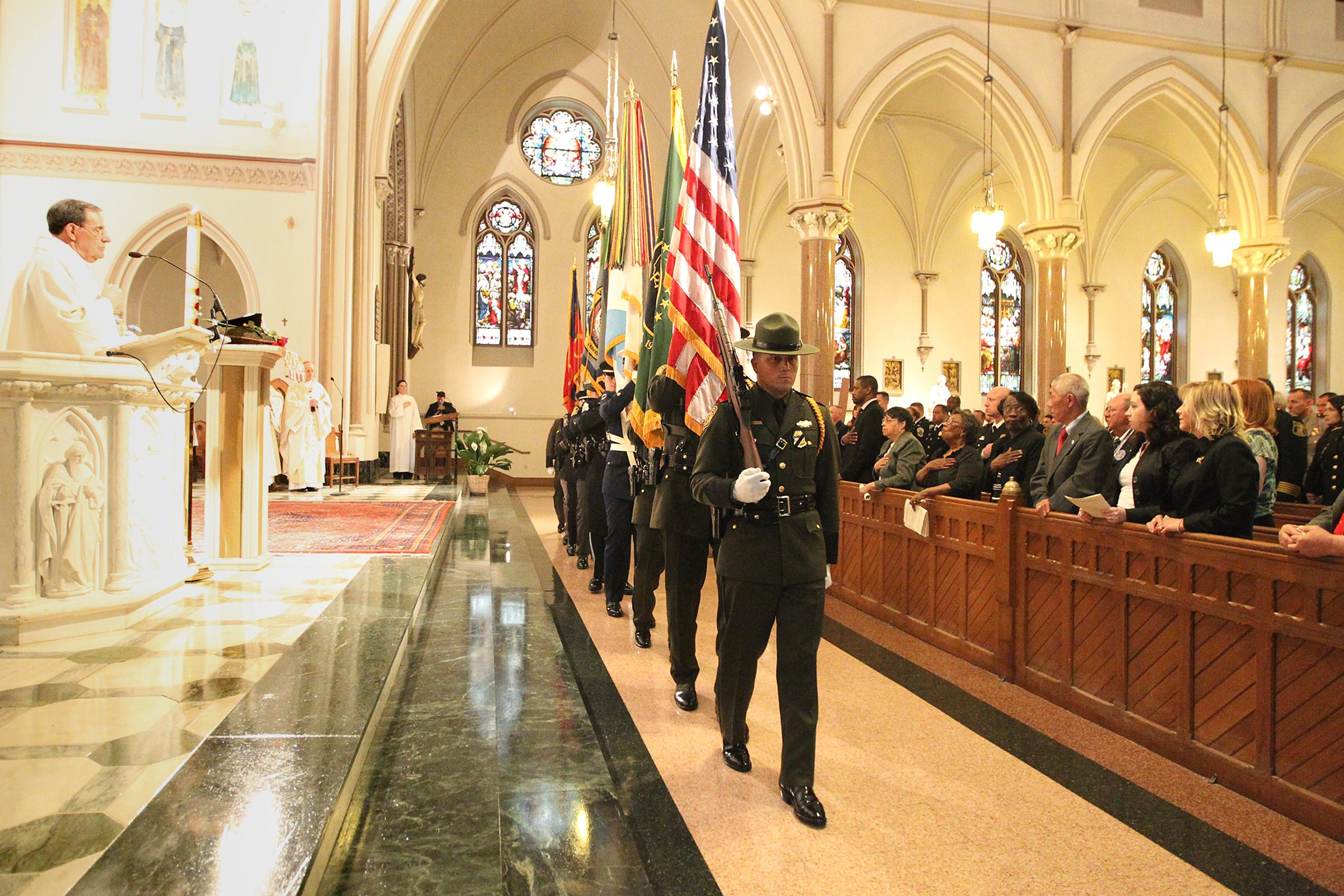
- Blue Mass at St. Patrick's Catholic Church (Washington, D.C.)
- Observed by: Catholics, Other Christians
- Significance: Honor veterans of the Public Safety field
- Date: Varies by community
- First time: 1934

A Blue Mass is a Mass celebrated annually throughout the United States in the Catholic Church for those employed in the "public safety field" (i.e. police officers, firefighters, correctional officers, 911 operators and EMS personnel). The color blue relates to the blue-colored uniforms predominantly used by these services. Similar to the Red Mass, the service honors those who have died in the line of duty and those currently serving as first responders. The Mass is an opportunity for the community to show gratitude to first responders and their families.

== Background ==
In Washington, D.C., the service is held in conjunction with National Police Week. Psalm 91:11, "For He will give His angels [especial] charge over you to accompany and defend and preserve you in all your ways [of obedience and service]," are often invoked during the service. Though usually held in a Catholic church, non-Catholics are generally invited to attend.

The Blue Mass dates to September 29, 1934, when Rev. Thomas Dade started the service as part of his duties with the Catholic Police and Fireman’s Society. The first Mass was held at St. Patrick’s Catholic Church in Washington, D.C., and has grown to a nationwide celebration. The September 29 service was timed to coincide with Michaelmas, the feast of Saint Michael the Archangel, the patron military saint of police officers and military.

== See also ==
- Military ordinariate
- Police chaplain
- Red Mass
