= Andersonpet =

- village
- Location in Karnataka, India Andersonpet (India)
- Coordinates: 12.934655°N 78.272867°E
- Country: India
- State: Karnataka
- Established: 1904

Languages
  - Official: Kannada
- Time zone: UTC+5:30 (IST)

Andersonpet is a township of Kolar Gold Fields, located in the Kolar district on Karnataka, India. It is situated in Kolar District of Karnataka state and having pin code of 563113.

== History ==
Established in 1904, Andersonpet is named after an officer of British India. In its early years, the township was locally known as "Beer Shop", as it housed the only government-licensed liquor store in the entire Kolar Gold Fields area.

== Places of interest ==
Champion Reefs situated in Andersonpet goes down to 17,000 feet and is the deepest mine in Asia. Andersonpet also has many bungalows and houses built in the Victorian style by the British for use by their officers.

One bank CORPORATION BANK KOLAR - KARNATAKA is situated at village. Aristotle College of Education is situated in village. It is for higher education.
