= Anthony Caffry =

Irish Catholic priest

The Reverend Anthony Caffry

Personal details
- Born: Ireland
- Died: 1811 Dublin, Ireland
- Denomination: Catholic Church
- Education: Esker Friary; Sorbonne

Anthony Caffry (died 1811), sometimes spelled Caffrey and recorded in Vatican documents as McCaffrey, was an Irish Catholic priest who was a friar in the Order of Preachers. He is best known for being the founder and first pastor of St. Patrick's Church, the first Catholic church in Washington, D.C.

== Biography ==
He was born near Newport, County Mayo, Ireland, and entered the Dominican Order in Esker in County Galway in 1777. Following his ordination, Father Caffry received a Doctor of Divinity degree from the Sorbonne in Paris. In 1794, he traveled to the United States and was charged by Bishop John Carroll with erecting the first Catholic parish in the city of Washington. Caffry's decision to undertake this project was likely influenced by Irish architect James Hoban, who asked Caffry to consider the Irish who worked to build the new federal capital. He first began holding services in rented spaces in the beginning of the year, but later built a modest, one-and-a-half story wood-frame church with the meager funds the parish had. The land on which it was built was purchased by Caffry on April 17, 1794, as two lots (numbers 5 and 6) on block 376 of the original plan of the District of Columbia between 9th and 10th Streets and F and G Streets. For these two lots, he paid 80 pounds to its seller, the United States government. During its establishment, he insisted that Leonard Neale, the coadjutor bishop of Baltimore, order the entire City of Washington be included within the territory of the parish. For ten years, Caffry resided as pastor of St. Patrick's in Washington. He resigned in 1804 when the parish required construction of a larger church, and was succeeded by William Matthews. He was then reassigned to New York, staying only three years before returning to Ireland. In 1811, he died suddenly in Dublin.

Catholic Church titles
New office	1st Pastor of St. Patrick's Church; 1794—1804	Succeeded by William Matthews
