= Swinley, Wigan =

Suburb in Greater Manchester, England

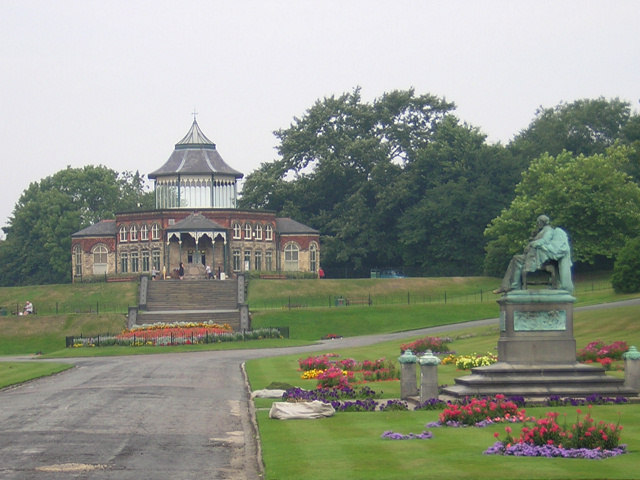
The pavilion at Mesnes Park as it looked in 2005

Swinley is an urban suburb of Wigan in Greater Manchester, England. The area was mainly developed during the late Victorian and Edwardian periods, from around 1885 until the end of the interwar years, along a green corridor centred on the section of the Chester–Lancaster Roman Road known as Wigan Lane. This route leads northwards from the original 1246 Royal Charter boundary of the Borough of Wigan towards the parish of Standish, lying between neighbouring industrial districts of mills, mines, and ironworks.

The suburb originally comprised a varied mix of villas, flats, and large townhouses built on what were then open fields, with later interwar development infilling the area with terraces. The area to the east of Wigan Lane, adjoining the Douglas Valley, retains a more exclusive character, with properties selling for between £500,000 and over £1 million.

Wigan was one of the four boroughs in Lancashire—alongside Liverpool, Lancaster, and Preston—to receive a royal charter. The borough was defined as the triangle area of land formed by the River Douglas as it curves around the hill on which the town was built; this hill now forms the modern town centre. Overspill development existed along the approach roads from an early date, and by the time of the Industrial Revolution many traders and residents had established themselves just beyond the town 'gates', where they were exempt from borough taxation.

In 1651 during the English Civil War, the Battle of Wigan Lane was fought between 3,000 Parliamentarians under Colonel Robert Lilburne and 1,500 Royalists under the Earl of Derby. The spot on Wigan Lane where Sir Thomas Tyldesley fell is marked by the Tyldesley war memorial, erected in 1679. Battle damage is still visible on the tower of All Saints' Church.

In 1878 Mesnes Park—begun in 1871—was completed, replacing two collieries and associated tramlines on land belonging to the rector of Wigan parish (the rector's demesne, which gave rise to the name Mesnes). Bridgeman Terrace, overlooking the park, had been built in 1876, and with public transport provided by the existing tramlines this may have helped to initiate the area's suburbanisation.

The grade II* listed parish church of St Michael and All Angels was completed in 1878 next to Swinley Hall, which has not survived. In 1881 the parish of Swinley (which included Whitley) was formed at St Michael's under the jurisdiction of the rector of Wigan parish. Under the Local Government Act 1888, the County Borough of Wigan was established in 1889, replacing the Municipal Borough of Wigan and incorporating all the lands of Wigan and, from 1904, the Pemberton parishes, which had previously been outside the town's municipal boundaries. In 1974 the County Borough of Wigan was dissolved and the Metropolitan Borough of Wigan was created within the county of Greater Manchester.

Swinley is bounded to the west by the tracks of the West Coast Main Line, to the south by Wigan town centre, and to the east the course of the River Douglas in leafy Douglas Valley (which at the time featured industrial ironworks). Haigh Country Park separates it from the suburb of Whelley. To the northwest, the land between Spencer Road and the west side of Wigan Lane—including Whitley Crescent and Trinity United Reformed Church—forms the small, similarly affluent suburb of Whitley, centred on Whitley Reservoir.

The 1894 Ordnance Survey map records Whitley Reservoir's origin as a gravel pit surrounded by country lanes, and the suburb developed at the same time as Swinley, between the late Victorian period and the First World War, in the Arts and Crafts style on a pre-planned grid. Meanwhile, Swinley continues northwards on the west side of Wigan Lane until it reaches Standish at Boars Head Reservoir.

The population of Swinley is around 11,000, and the area is mainly residential, with offices and a principal high street along Wigan Lane. It also contains the large Royal Albert Edward Infirmary, the Victorian Mesnes Park, cricket, tennis, and bowls clubs, and a Tesco Extra supermarket built on the former site of Central Park, the previous stadium of the Wigan Warriors.
