= KGF School =

KGF School is a combined primary school and high school campus in Kolar Gold Fields, India. It was founded by the John Taylor and Sons Company in 1899 or 1900 to educate the children of European gold mine staff. Initially, only European children were admitted. Eventually, admission was opened up to some Anglo-Indian and even later Indian children, but they were segregated from the European children.

By the 1970s, the school mostly served local children, and there were enough students that the primary and secondary schools were split into separate buildings. The primary school became known as Parkinson Memorial, and the high school was called J.K. Lindsay Memorial. In the 1990s, the schools were merged back onto the main campus. Due to the closure of gold mining operations in the area, the school declinedover the subsequent years to the point of almost closing. In 2009, a group of alumni founded the KGF Foundation and fundraised to keep the school open.
