= St. Michael's and All Angels' Church, Oorgaum, KGF =

St. Michael's and All Angels' Church
- St. Michael's and All Angels' Church, Oorgaum
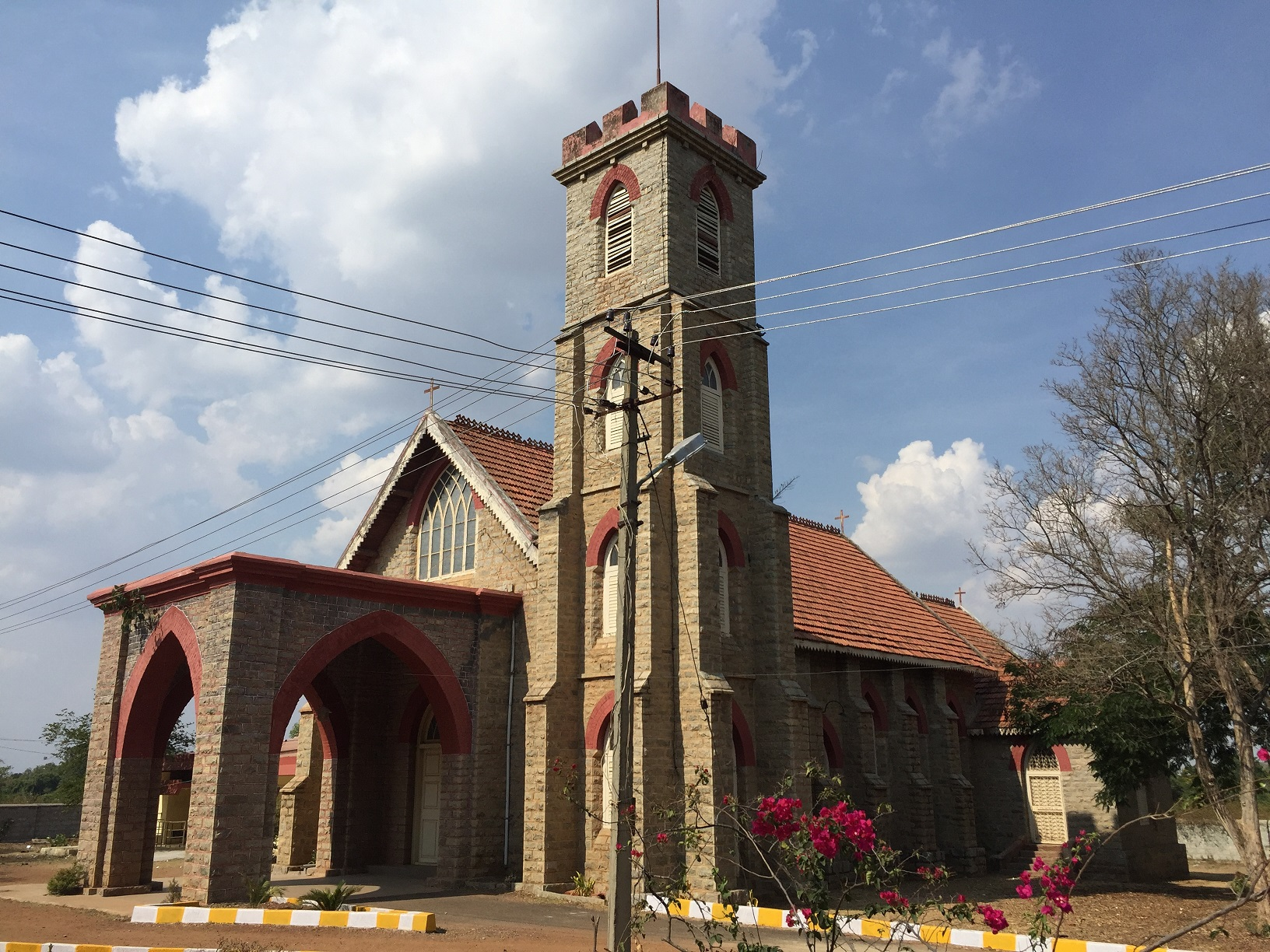
- St. Michael's and All Angels' Church, Oorgaum, KGF
- St. Michael's and All Angels' Church
- 12°56′57″N 78°15′06″E
- Location: Cooke Road, Oorgaum, Kolar Gold Fields
- Country: India
- Denomination: Church of South India
- Tradition: Anglican

History
- Consecrated: 3 March 1905

Architecture
- Architectural type: Victorian
- Style: English
- Groundbreaking: 8 October 1903
- Completed: 1905

Administration
- Diocese: Karnataka Central Diocese

Clergy
- Bishop: Rt. Rev. Dr. Prasana Kumar Samuel

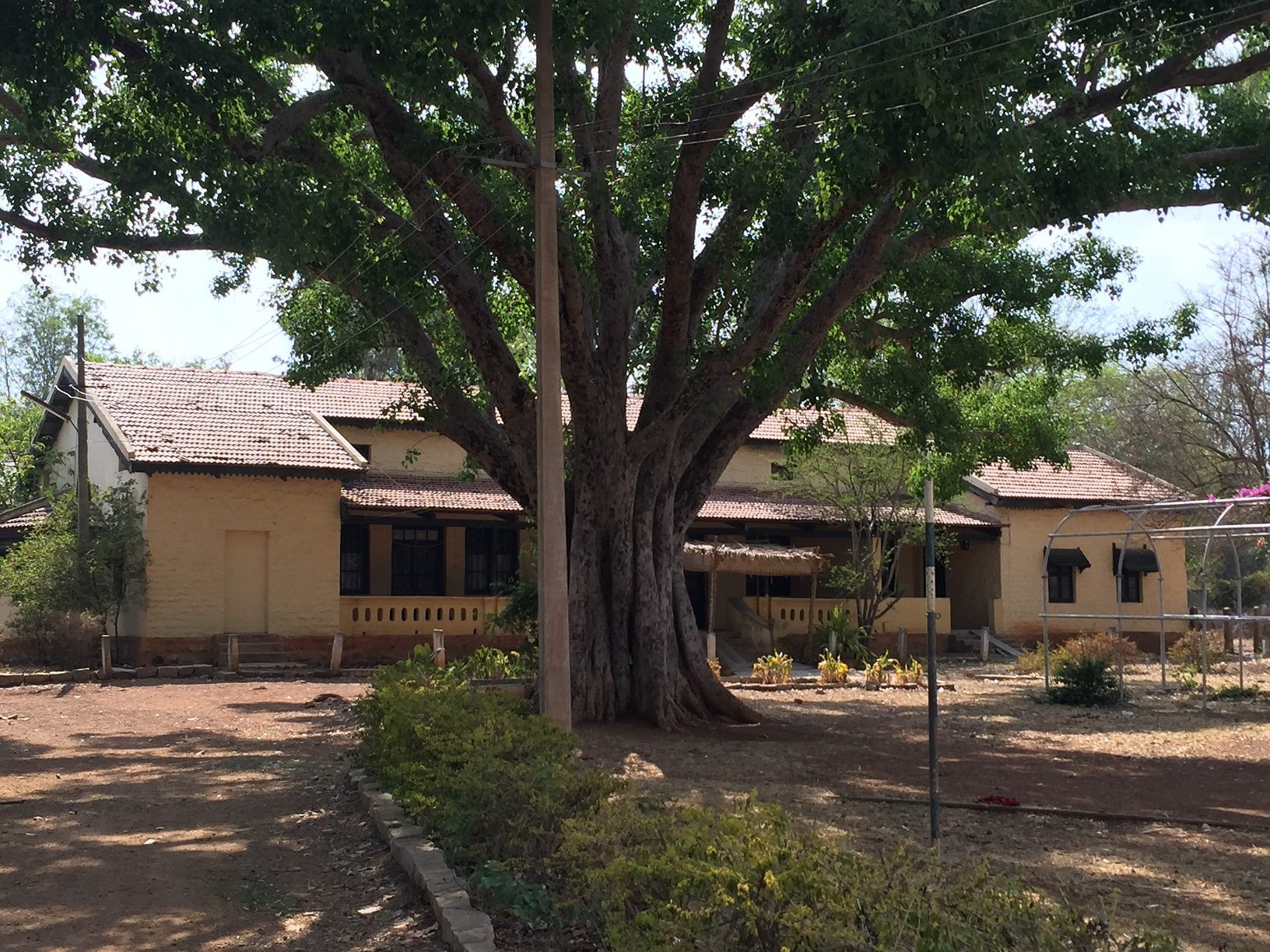
St. Michael's and All Angels' Parsonage, Oorgaum, KGF

St. Michael's and All Angels' Church is located at Oorgaum, Kolar Gold Fields, India. The church stands on Cooke Road, near the KGF Club, south of the Catholic Mother of Mines Church. The origin of the church goes back to 1899, and was for the exclusive use of the (white) officers of the John Taylor and Sons, London, which owned the gold mines at Kolar Gold Fields (KGF), Mysore State.

== History ==
St. Michael's and All Angels' Church, Oorgaum was the very first Anglican Church to be raised in KGF. It traces its history to the St. Paul's Church, Oorgaum, the original church which was moved to Robertsonpet. The Church was for the exclusive use for the officers of the John Taylor and Sons Company, with the pews being reserved with names of the families. The church was located in an exclusive secluded zone accessible only to white officers of the mining company.

== St. Paul's Church, Oorgaum ==
According to a report in 1916, by M L Griffith-Jones for the Church of England Men’s Society (CEMS), in 1894, a small church was raised in Oorgaum, Kolar Gold Fields (this is near the compressor house of the Bullen Shaft). The church was basic and was built with funds which raised by Rev, W F Penny, Secretary of the Indian Church Aid Association, London. The Church at Oorgaum was consecrated in memory of St. Paul and was under the control of the Society for the Propagation of the Gospel in Foreign Parts (SPG), with Rev. James Sharp as its first chaplain. The church could accommodate 60 people and the services were conducted in English and Tamil.

Rev. L Giffard Pollard was appointed as the chaplain of the St. Paul's Anglican Church in December 1901. During his tenure, the process of building a new church started, as the present structure had developed cracks as a result of sinking the Bullen shaft near the church. It was decided to build two separate churches for the English and the Tamil congregations. The church building and land was taken over by the Oorgaum Company, and compensation was paid to the SPG. With these funds the SPG raised a new St. Paul's Church at New Town or Robertsonpet for the Tamil Anglican community of KGF. Land was given by the Gold Fields of Mysore Company, near the KGF Club, a short distance from the site of the old St. Paul's Church for constructing a new English Anglican Church.

== St. Michael's and All Angels' Church, Oorgaum ==
On 8 October 1903, the foundation stone for the new English Anglican church was laid on the site allotted by the Gold Fields of Mysore Company. The church and parsonage was constructed in the Victorian style, using bricks and stones. The church was consecrated as the St. Michael's and All Angels' Church on 3 March 1905.

The altar, pulpit and the pews were removed from the old St. Paul's Church, Oorgaum and installed at the new church, along with a new carved teak lectern. A pipe organ was obtained from Madras and was installed at the church.

== Church of South India ==
St. Michael's and All Angels' Church was under the administration of the Church of England, Madras Diocese, with the chaplains being appointed by the John Taylor and Sons Company. After Indian independence in 1947, the church was transferred to the Church of South India, Mysore Diocese.

== Present times ==
The Church celebrated its centenary in 2015. The church receives visitors from around the world. Most of the visitors come in search of the church where their ancestors were christened or baptised. The church has a relationship with the South India Biblical Seminary, and practical training to trainee pastors.
