= King George Hall, Kolar Gold Fields =

Coordinates: 12°57′22.4″N 78°16′26.2″E

King George Hall is the town hall of the city of Kolar Gold Fields in India. It is situated in the centre of Robertsonpet and was built in honour of the then emperor of India, King George. It is built in the Victorian style with a lawn and garden in front of it.
