= Church of St Michael and All Angels, Wigan =

Listed church in Greater Manchester, England

- St Michael and All Angels' Church, Wigan
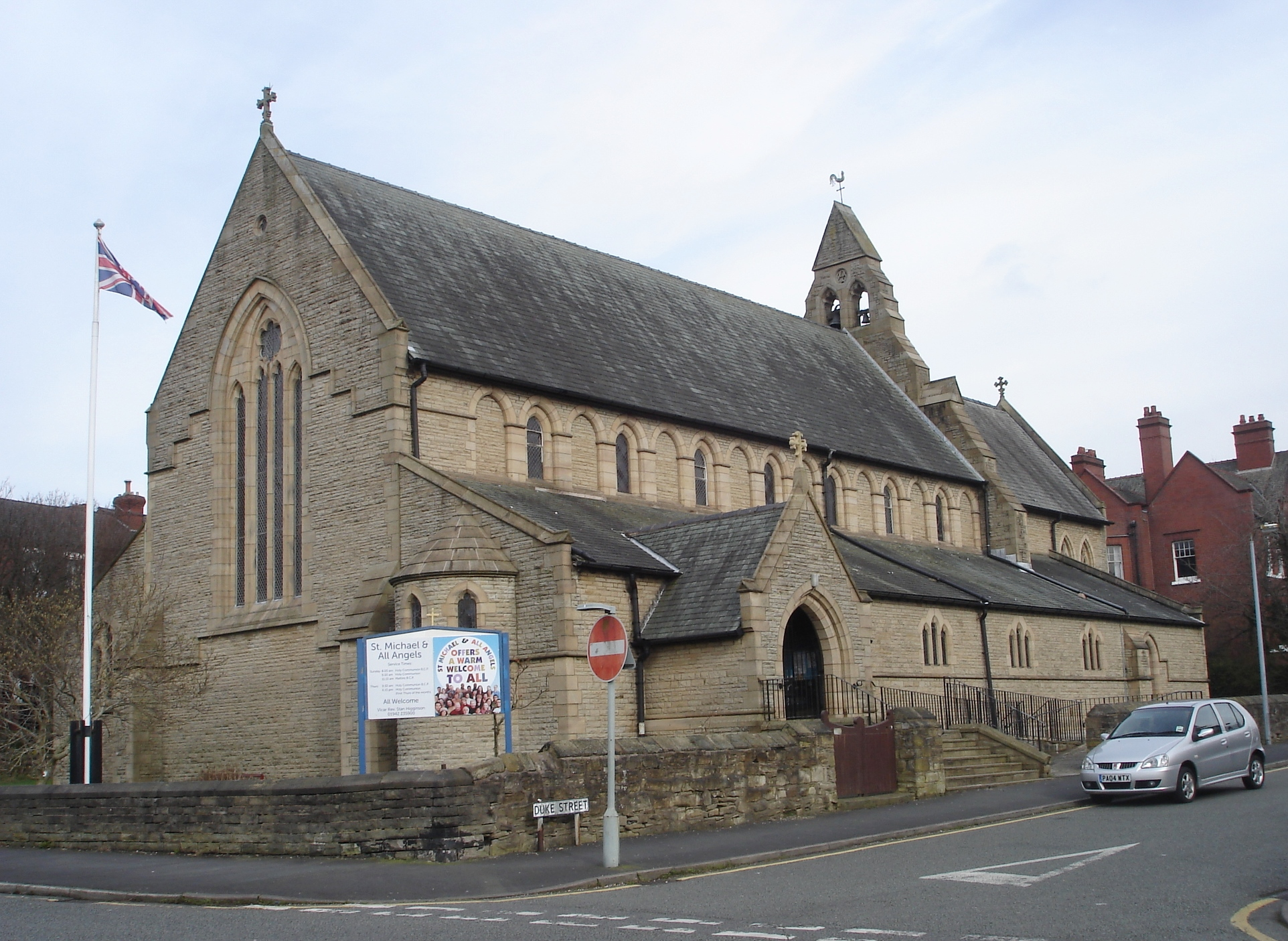
- Church of St Michael and All Angels in 2014

- Location in Greater Manchester
- 53.5540°N 2.6297°W
- OS grid reference: SD 58377 06555
- Address: Duke Street, Swinley, Wigan, Greater Manchester
- Country: England
- Denomination: Anglican
- Website: St Michael and All Angels

History
- Dedication: St Michael
- Consecrated: 25 April 1878; 148 years ago

Architecture
- Heritage designation: Grade II*
- Designated: 11 July 1983
- Architect: G. E. Street
- Architectural type: Church
- Style: Early English Gothic
- Years built: 1875–1878; 148 years ago

Specifications
- Materials: Stone, slate

Administration
- Diocese: Diocese of Chester

Clergy
- Priest: Rev. Stan Higginson

The Church of St Michael and All Angels is an Anglican parish church on Duke Street in Swinley, an urban suburb of Wigan, Greater Manchester, England. It forms part of the ecclesiastical deanery of Wigan in the Diocese of Chester. The building was designed by the architect G. E. Street in the Early English Gothic style and erected between 1875 and 1878. It is recorded in the National Heritage List for England as a Grade II* listed building.

== History ==
St Michael and All Angels was established in response to the rapid suburban expansion of Wigan during the mid‑19th century. Before a permanent church existed, services for the growing population of Swinley were held informally, including in domestic rooms provided by local residents; by 1856 the district had its own curate attached to the parish church of All Saints, Wigan.

The present church was designed by the prominent Victorian architect George Edmund Street, a leading figure of the Gothic Revival whose major works include the Royal Courts of Justice in London. Street had already undertaken several commissions in Wigan, including the now-demolished St Michael's Day School on Earl Street (1867), and Wigan Hall and its gatehouse (1875–76). His design for the church adopted the Early English Gothic style, characterised by lancet windows, steeply pitched roofs, and a stone‑built exterior.

Construction began in 1875, and the church was consecrated in 1878 as a chapel of ease to All Saints' Church, serving the northern suburbs of the town. In 1881 it became a parish church in its own right, with a new parish formed from parts of Swinley and Whitley under the jurisdiction of the rector of Wigan.

Although the main body of the church was completed in 1878, the building was not finished until 1885, when the south aisle, lady chapel, porch, and baptistery were added, completing Street's intended plan. The church was consecrated on 25 April 1878 by Rev. William Jacobson, the bishop of Chester.

On 11 July 1983, the Church of St Michael was designated a Grade II* listed building. The church remains part of the deanery of Wigan in the Diocese of Chester.

== Architecture ==
The church is built of snecked sandstone with roofs mostly of green slate. Its plan includes a nave with aisles, and a chancel with a transept and vestry. The nave has a clerestory with pilasters and two‑centred arches, and seven chamfered windows set between blank arches. The west front has a tall four‑light window with a multifoil above it, and the east end has a buttressed wall rising to a gabled bellcote with two openings.

The aisles have shallow roofs, with the north aisle containing shorter windows above a stepped sill band. A gabled porch with a double‑chamfered arch projects from the south aisle, and at the west end there is a small apse with three windows. The vestry extends the south aisle and has a two‑centred doorway and a three‑light window on its east side. The north transept has a two‑light window and buttresses, and the chancel has paired two‑light windows with quatrefoils and a three‑light east window.

=== Interior ===
Internally, the church has a five‑bay nave arcade with cylindrical columns and two‑centred arches. Above it is a string course and a clerestory with alternating windows and blind openings. The nave roof is a tiered timber structure with arch‑bracing. The large chancel arch contains an early 20th‑century Perpendicular-style screen. The chancel has two wide arches to the north for the organ and a two‑bay arcade to the south leading to the lady chapel. It also contains a carved alabaster reredos, statues set in the east-window reveals, and a ribbed barrel-vaulted wooden ceiling. At the west end of the south aisle is an apsidal baptistery beneath a cusped arch, and at the west end of the church is a carved wooden war memorial screen.

== See also ==
- Grade II* listed buildings in Greater Manchester
- Listed buildings in Wigan
