= St. Michael and All Angels' Anglican Church, Weltevreden Park =

Coordinates: 26.127305°S 27.923112°E

St Mike's
- St. Michael and All Angels' Anglican Church
- St Mike's
- Location: Weltevreden Park
- Country: South Africa
- Denomination: Anglican

Administration
- Province: Southern Africa
- Diocese: Diocese of Johannesburg
- Parish: Weltevreden Park

The Parish of Weltevreden Park is represented solely by St. Michael and All Angels' Anglican Church. It is located at 1123 Cornelius Street.

The Parish of Weltevreden Park is a parish of the Anglican Diocese of Johannesburg, part of the Anglican Church of Southern Africa. Weltevreden Park is one of the western suburbs of Johannesburg.
