= Robertsonpet =

- City
- Location in Karnataka, India
- Coordinates: 12.9547°N 78.2767°E
- Country: India
- State: Karnataka
- District: Kolar

Area
  - Total: 58.12 km^{2} (22.44 sq mi)
- Elevation: 843 m (2,766 ft)

Population (2011)
  - Total: 162,230
  - Density: 2,433.31/km^{2} (6,302.2/sq mi)

Languages
  - Official: Kannada
- Time zone: UTC+5:30 (IST)
- PIN: 563 122
- Telephone code: 08153
- Vehicle registration: KA-08

Robertsonpet is a township in the city of Kolar Gold Fields in India. The township was planned and built to accommodate the increasing population of the city of Kolar Gold Fields. The town hall popularly known as King George Hall was built in Victorian style with a lawn and garden in front of it.

Robertsonpet was established in 1902 and named after Sir Donald Robertson the British Resident of the Princely state of Mysore. It is considered to be one of the first planned townships in modern-day India.

== History ==
In the late 19th and early 20th century, the mining industry expanded under the John Taylor and Sons Company. In its peak period, it employed 4500 employees, and the waste rocky terrain was developed into a township. The township was first established in 1901 as New Town, to house the population working in the KGF Mines. On 15 August 1903, the township was renamed as Robertsonpet. The town got its name at the insistence of the Maharaja of Mysore, who named it after Sir Donald Robertson the British Resident of Mysore. As the township grew, tradesmen such as bakers, confectioners, jewellers, pawn brokers, barbers, timber merchants, tailors, etc. migrated and set up shop in Robertsonpet.

A town hall (similar to town halls in Australia) was built in Victorian architectural style with arches, canopies and large gardens, and was named as the King George Hall. The KGF Club in Oorgaum and the King George Hall Cosmopolitan Club were established providing faculties for badminton, tennis, cards, carom, snooker, etc.

== Demographics ==
There is also a substantial Anglo-Indian population at KGF, descendants of the English mine supervisors. Robertsonpet is a melting pot of cultures with people of different communities: Kannada, Anglo Indian, Tamil, Telugu, Marwari, Muslims, etc., living in the township.

Religions in Robersonpet (2011)
Religion	Percent
Hinduism	78.16%
Christianity	12.07%
Islam	8.58%
Other or not stated	1.19%

Languages of Robertsonpet (2011)
1. Tamil (65.5%)
2. Telugu (15.0%)
3. Urdu (8.06%)
4. Kannada (7.20%)
5. Hindi (1.61%)
6. Malayalam (1.46%)
7. Others (1.16%)

== Sir Donald Robertson ==
Sir Donald Robertson is credited with starting the hydro-electric plant at Shivanasamudra, which supplied electricity to the KGF Mines. Robertson served as the British Resident of the Mysore Darbar in the 1900s, and during his tenure drafted the Constitution of the princely state of Mysore. He worked towards providing amenities to the population of KGF, even to those who were not employed by the mines, and is largely credited for establishing the KGF mining towns. In recognition of his services, His Highness the Maharaja of Mysore Krishna Raja Wadiyar IV renamed New Town as Robertsonpet. After retirement from government services, Robertson joined the mining enterprise John Taylor and Sons Company. He died on 13 October 1930.(p. 291)
