= Church of St Michael & All Angels, Greinton =

Church in Somerset, England

Church of St Michael & All Angels
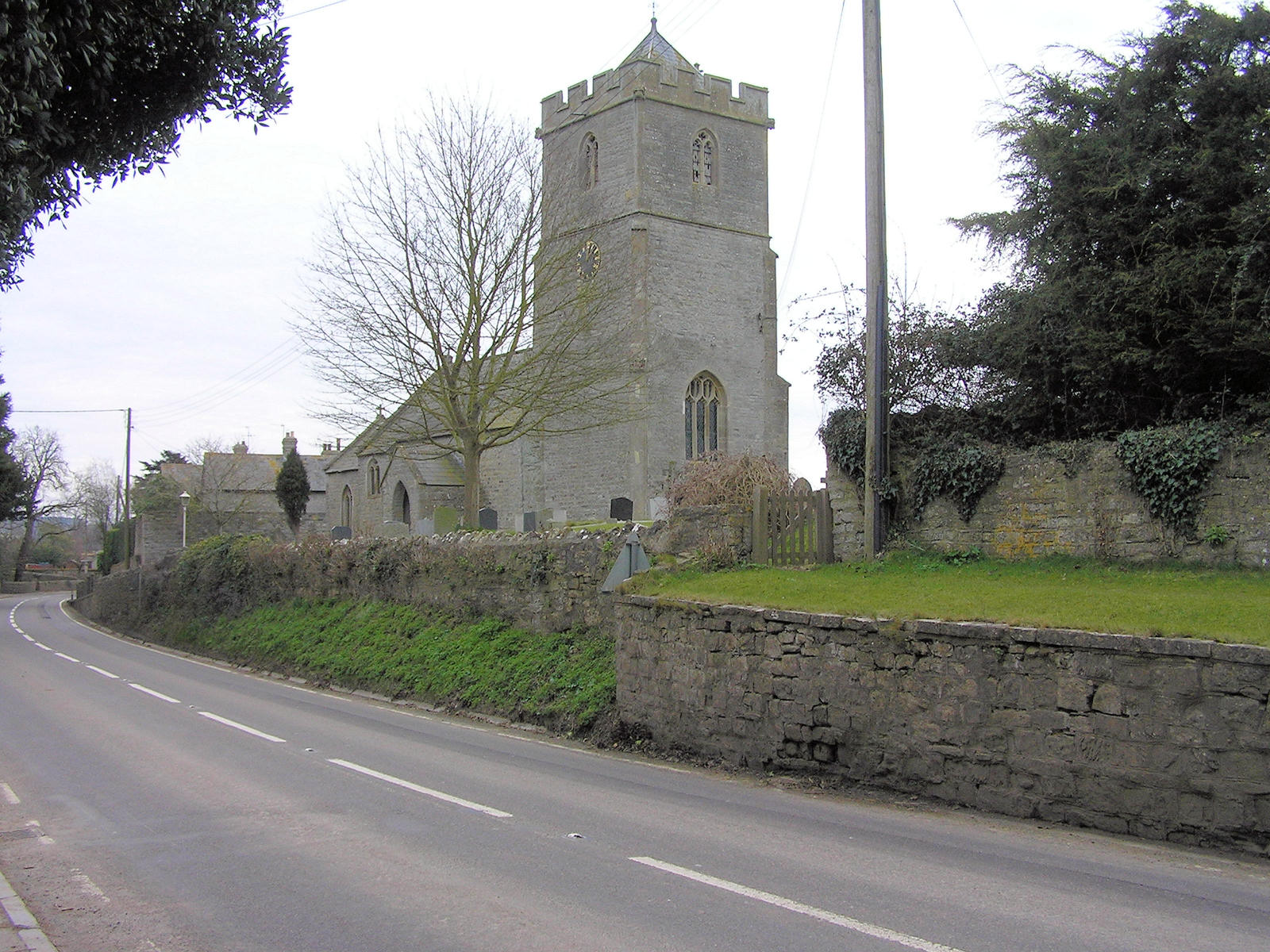

- Location within Somerset

General information
- Location: Greinton, England
- Coordinates: 51.1240°N 2.8407°W
- Completed: 12th century

The Church of St Michael & All Angels in Greinton, Somerset, England has parts which date to the 12th century, with evidence that it may have been built on a pre-Christian site. It has been designated as a Grade I listed building.

The church was refurbished in the 14th, 15th and 16th centuries, the church seems to have been led by a cast of colorful clergy, dating at least to 1259 when Boniface de Foliano was rector.

In 1397 the rector was accused of attacking the vicar of Pawlett during mass and extorting money and livestock from him . . . John Hyne, rector 1584–1624, was in prison in 1590, leaving the church unserved. . . In the 1600s Hyne was presented for minor infringements such as allowing a girl of 12 to be a godmother. He also refused a couple communion and accused the wardens of buying watered wine.

The tower, which dates from the 15th century, has a ring of six bells, including a medieval Bristol bell, bells dated 1586,1707, 1788, and two dated 1899. Major repairs and renovations were carried out in the Victorian era, including the addition of stained glass and a north porch, and the conversion of the south porch to a vestry. Incomplete records in the church register go back to 1655, with complete records from 1777.

== See also ==
- List of Grade I listed buildings in Sedgemoor
- List of towers in Somerset
- List of ecclesiastical parishes in the Diocese of Bath and Wells
