= Michaelmas =

Christian festival

Feast of Saints Michael, Gabriel, Raphael
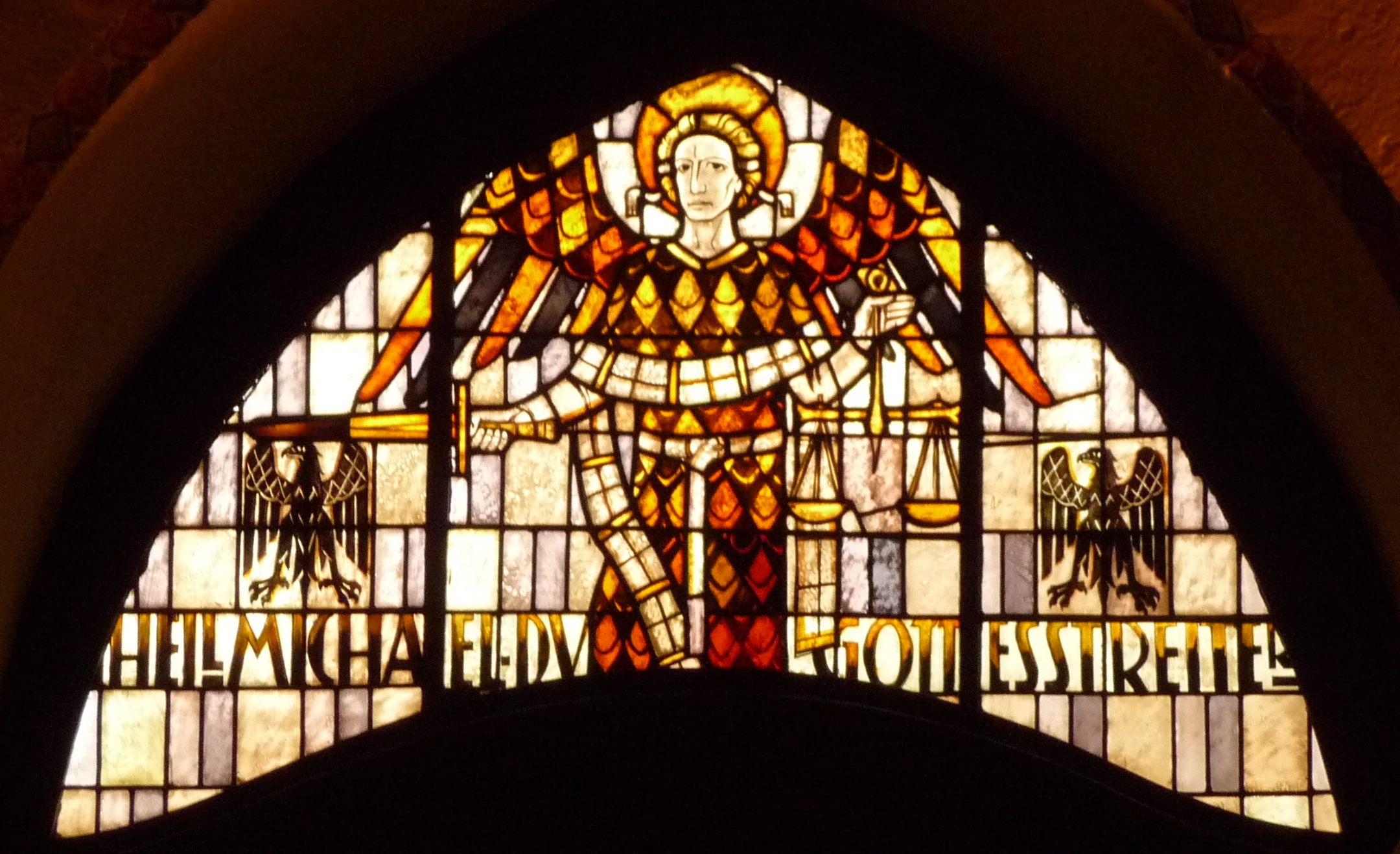
- Saint Michael the Archangel
- Observed by: Catholic Church; Lutheran churches; Anglican Communion; Western Orthodoxy
- Date: 29 September (Western Christianity); 8 November (Eastern Christianity)
- Frequency: Annual

Michaelmas (/ˈmɪkəlməs/ MIK-əl-məs), also known as the Feast of Saints Michael, Gabriel and Raphael, the Feast of the Archangels, and the Feast of Saint Michael and All Angels, is a Christian festival observed in many Western Christian liturgical calendars on 29 September, and on 8 November in the Eastern Christian traditions. Michaelmas has been one of the four quarter days of the English and Irish financial, judicial and academic year.

In the Christian angelology of some traditions, the Archangel Michael is considered as the greatest of all the angels, being particularly honoured for defeating Satan in the War in Heaven.

== History ==
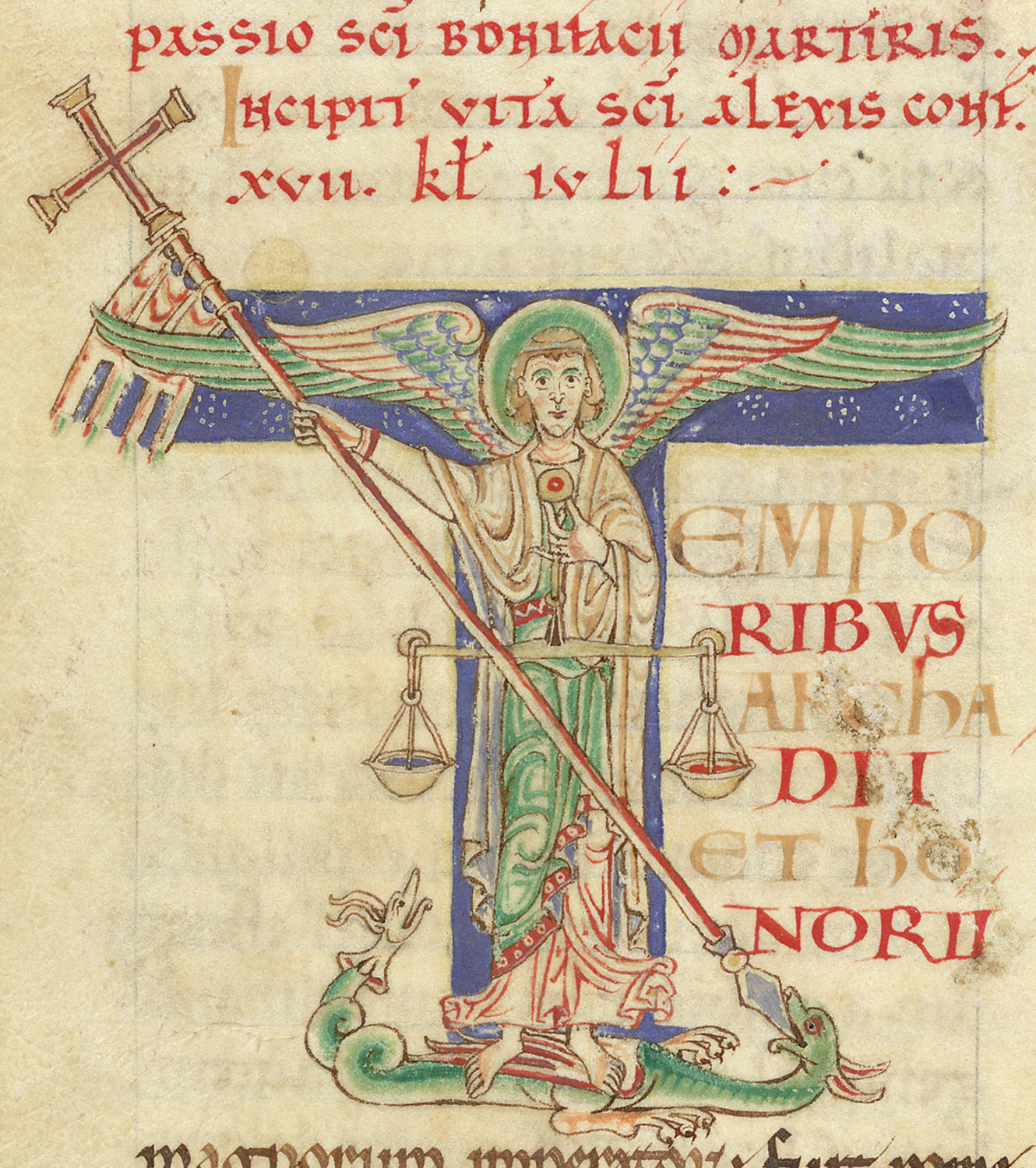
Saint Michael defeats the Dragon, from a 12th-century manuscript.

The name Michaelmas comes from a shortening of "Michael's Mass", in the same style as Christmas (Christ's Mass) and Candlemas (Candle Mass, the Mass where traditionally the candles to be used throughout the year would be blessed).

During the Middle Ages, Michaelmas was celebrated as a Holy Day of Obligation, but this tradition was abolished in the 18th century. In medieval England, Michaelmas marked the ending and beginning of the husbandman's year; George C. Homans observes: "At that time harvest was over, and the bailiff or reeve of the manor would be making out the accounts for the year."

Because it falls near the equinox, this holy day is associated in the Northern Hemisphere with the beginning of autumn and the shortening of days. It was also one of the English, Welsh, and Irish quarter days, when accounts had to be settled. On manors, it was the day when a reeve was elected from the peasants. Michaelmas hiring fairs were held at the end of September or beginning of October. The day was also considered a "gale day" in Ireland when rent would be due, as well as a day for the issuing or settling of contracts or other legal transactions.

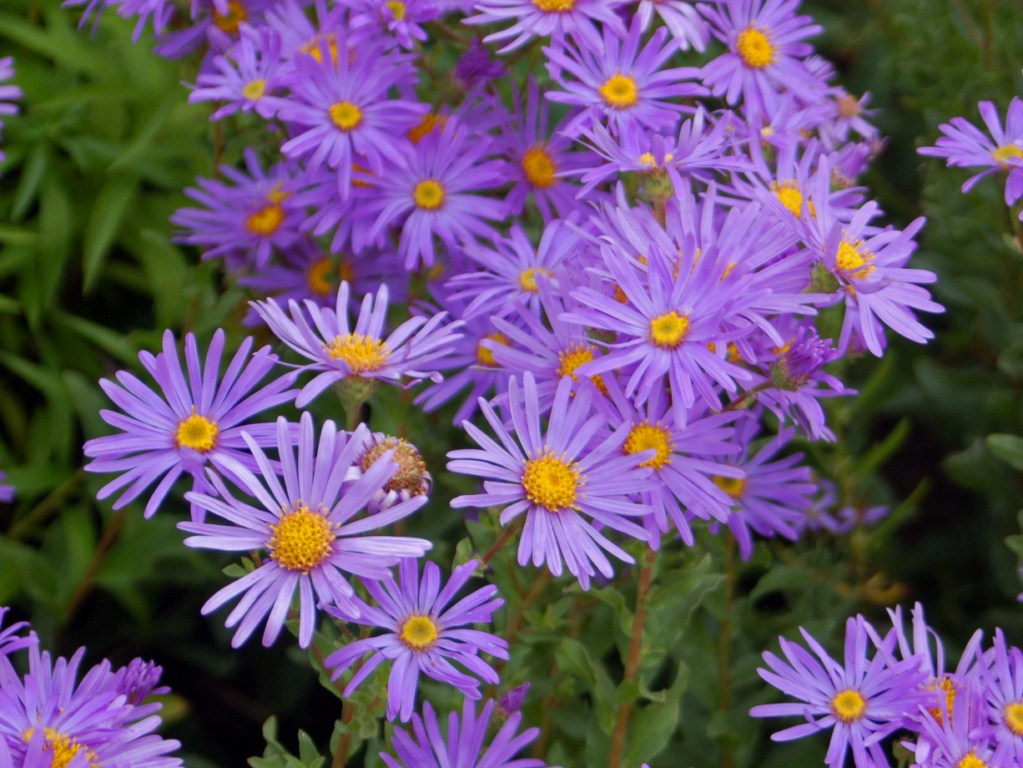
Michaelmas daisy

== Celebration ==
On the Isle of Skye, Scotland, a procession was held. One of the few flowers left around at this time of year is the Michaelmas daisy (also known as asters). Hence the rhyme: "The Michaelmas daisies, among dead weeds, Bloom for St Michael's valorous deeds ..."

In Ireland, (Irish: Fómhar na nGéanna), pilgrimages to holy wells associated with St Michael took place, with pilgrims taking a drink from the holy water from the well. The greeting "May Michaelmas féinín on you" was traditional. Boys born on this day were often christened Michael or Micheál. In Tramore, County Waterford, a procession with an effigy of St Michael, called the Micilín, was brought through the town to the shore to mark the end of the fishing season. In Irish folklore, clear weather on Michaelmas was a portent of a long winter, "Michaelmas Day be bright and clear there will be two 'Winters' in the year."

=== Food ===
A traditional meal for the day includes goose known as a stubble-goose (one prepared around harvest time, fattened on the stubble fields) also known as an embling or rucklety goose. There was a saying that "if you eat goose on Michaelmas Day you will never lack money all year". Tenant farmers sometimes presented the geese to their landlords, as could be stipulated in their tenancy agreements. The custom dates to at least the 15th century, and was easily continued as geese are in their prime at Michaelmas time.

One association of geese with Michaelmas comes from a legend in which the son of an Irish king choked on a goose bone he had eaten, and was then brought back to life by St. Patrick. The king ordered the sacrifice of a goose every Michaelmas in honour of the saint. The Irish Michaelmas goose was slaughtered and eaten on the day; they were also presented as gifts or donated to the poor. In parts of Ireland sheep were also slaughtered with tradition of the "St. Michael's portion" donated to the poor. Poultry markets and fairs took place to sell geese as well as mutton pies. In Ulster, it was traditional for tenants to present their landlord with a couple of geese, a tradition dating back to Edward IV. There were differing methods across Ireland for cooking the goose, most generally using a heavy iron pot on an open hearth. In Blacklion, County Cavan, the goose was covered in local blue clay and placed at the centre of the fire until the clay broke, indicating the goose was cooked.

Another legend surrounding the origin of the Michaelmas goose is that Queen Elizabeth I was eating a goose on the holiday when she heard of the defeat of the Spanish Armada, and thus proclaimed that geese should be eaten by everyone each year in commemoration of the victory. This falls apart when the date (geese and Michaelmas were connected at least a century earlier, if not longer) and the timing of the battle (August) are considered.

The custom of baking a special bread or cake, called Sruthan Mhìcheil (Scottish Gaelic pronunciation: [ˈs̪t̪ɾu.an ˈviːçal]), St. Michael's bannock, or Michaelmas bannock, on the eve of the Feast of Saint Michael, the Archangel, probably originated in the Hebrides. The bread was made from equal parts of barley, oats, and rye without using any metal implements. In remembrance of absent friends or those who had died, special Struans, blessed at an early morning Mass, were given to the poor in their names.

Nuts were traditionally cracked on Michaelmas Eve.

Folklore in the British Isles suggests that Michaelmas day is the last day that blackberries can be picked. It is said that when St. Michael expelled the devil, Lucifer, from heaven, he fell from the skies and landed in a prickly blackberry bush. Satan cursed the fruit, scorched them with his fiery breath, stamped, spat, and urinated on them, so that they would be unfit for eating. As it is considered ill-advised to eat them after 11 October (Old Michaelmas Day according to the Julian Calendar), a Michaelmas pie is made from the last of the season. In Ireland, the soiling of blackberries is also attributed to a púca.

== Differences in number of archangels ==
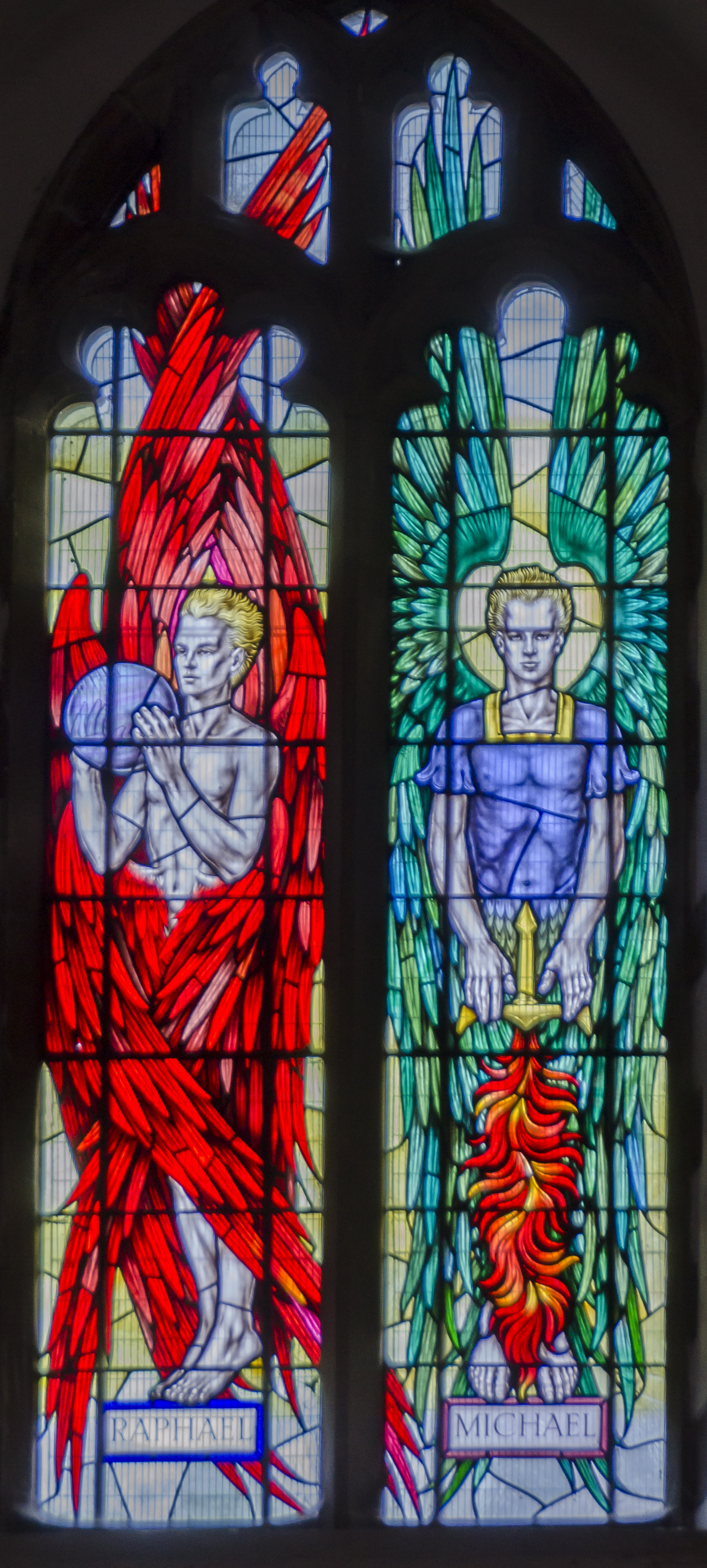
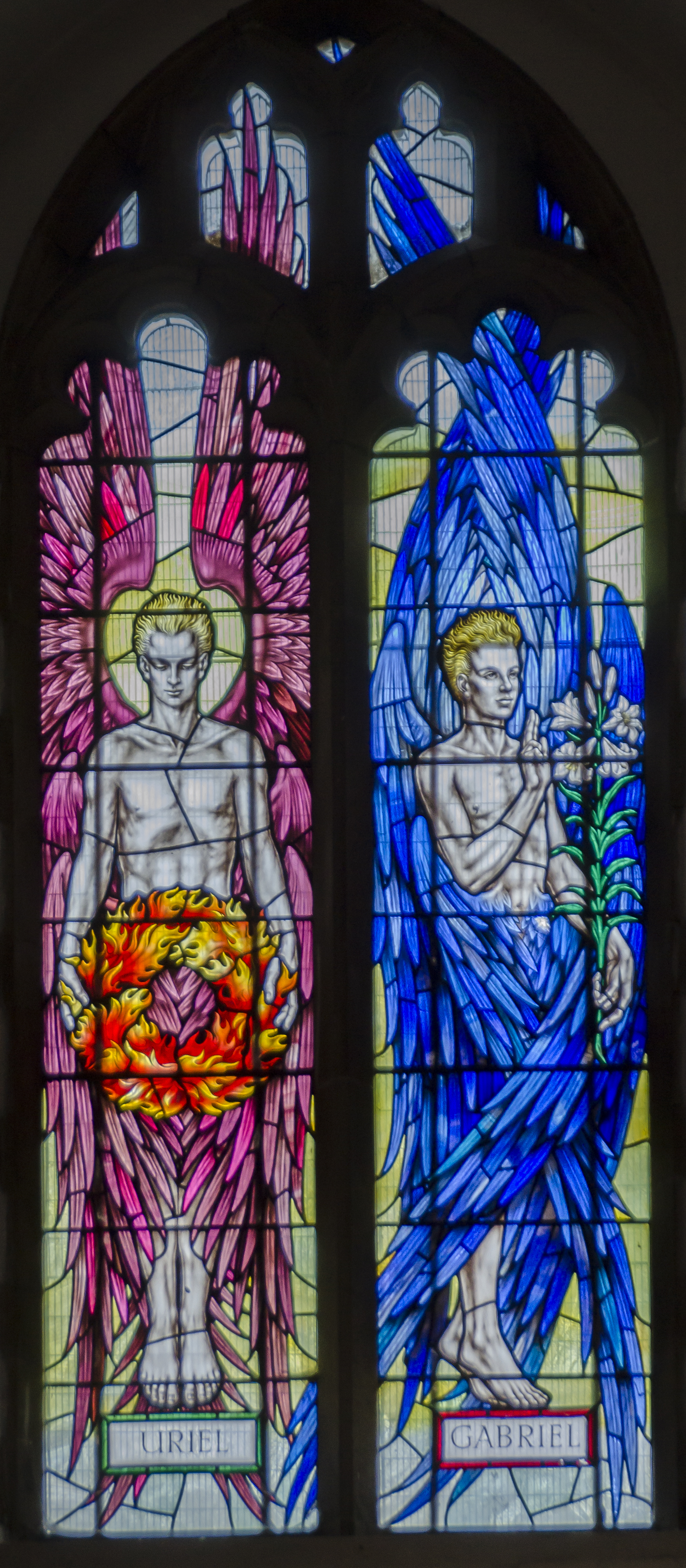
Stained glass of the four archangels, at the Anglican Church of St James, Grimsby. From left to right: Raphael, Michael, Uriel, and Gabriel

In the Roman Catholic Church on 29 September and the Eastern Orthodox Church on 08 November three Archangels are celebrated: Saint Michael, Saint Gabriel, and Saint Raphael. Their feasts were unified in the Catholic Church in one common day during the second half of the 20th century. In the time before their feasts were: 29 September (only St Michael), 24 March for St Gabriel, and 24 October for St Raphael.

In the Lutheran and Anglican traditions, there are three to four archangels in their calendars for the 29 September feast for St. Michael and All Angels: Michael (Jude 1:9) and Gabriel (Daniel 9:21), Raphael (Tobit 12:15) and sometimes Uriel (2 Esdras 4:1 and 2 Esdras 5:20). (Note: In traditional Protestantism, such as the Lutheran Churches, Anglican Churches and Anabaptist Churches, Daniel lies in the Old Testament and Revelation is in the New Testament. Tobit and 2 Esdras are intertestamental books, being a part of the Apocrypha section of the Protestant Bible that straddles the Old Testament and New Testament.)

== Autumn term in universities ==
Michaelmas is used in the extended sense of autumn, as the name of the first term of the academic year, which begins at this time at various educational institutions in the United Kingdom, Ireland and those parts of the Commonwealth in the northern hemisphere. These include the universities of Cambridge, London, Durham, Lancaster, Oxford, Swansea, and Dublin. However, the ancient Scottish universities used the name Martinmas for their autumn term, following the old Scottish term days.

== Use by legal profession ==
The Inns of Court of the English Bar and the Honorable Society of King's Inns in Ireland also have a Michaelmas term as one of their dining terms. It begins in September and ends towards the end of December.

The term is also the name of the first of four terms into which the legal year is divided by the courts of Ireland and England and Wales.

In the United Kingdom, the United States and Ireland, a Red Mass is traditionally convened on the Sunday closest to Michaelmas, in honor of and to bless lawyers and judges.

Terms are not used by most courts in the United States, where court calendars are usually continuous and year-round. However the U.S. Supreme Court operates on an annual term and roughly follows the English custom by beginning that term on the first Monday in October, a few days after Michaelmas.

== Modern observances ==
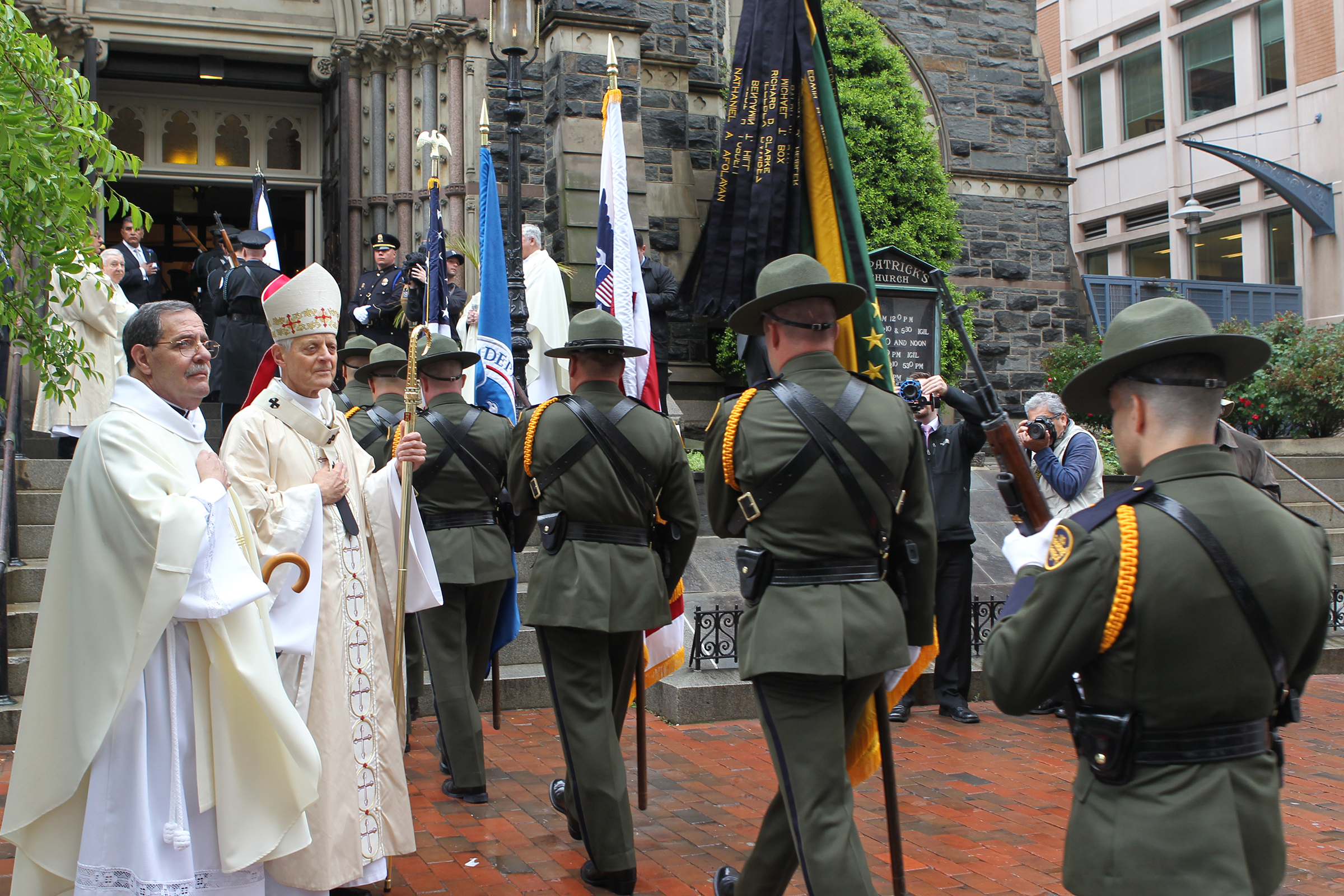
Blue Mass

Because Saint Michael is the patron of police officers, Michaelmas may also see a Blue Mass. Lutheran Christians consider it a principal feast of Christ.

Michaelmas is still celebrated in Waldorf schools. Rudolf Steiner considered it the second most important festival after Easter. The celebration of this holiday teaches the importance of facing fears and strengthening resolve. As the first festival of the new school year, it is celebrated with an all-school play, in which each class assumes a role, such as peasants, townspeople, nobles, etc. Students assume a new role as they pass from grade to grade, and it becomes something of a rite of passage.

In the City of London, Michaelmas is the day when the new Lord Mayor of London is elected, in the Common Hall.

In Mifflin County, Pennsylvania, Michaelmas has been observed since 1786 as Goose Day. Local tradition holds that eating goose on 29 September will bring prosperity. The Juniata River Valley began celebrating this version of Michaelmas when a Pennsylvania Dutchman named Andrew Pontius moved his family to neighbouring Snyder County to farm. When his farm prospered, he decided to hire a tenant farmer to help. On his way to Lancaster to hire a German immigrant, he stopped in Harrisburg for the night, where he met a young Englishman named Archibald Hunter, who was offered the job. His employment contract specified that their accounts were to be settled each year on the traditional day to do so, 29 September. When that day came, Hunter appeared at Pontius' door with his accounts and a goose, explaining that in England, eating a goose on 29 September brought good luck. The tradition spread to nearby Lewistown, Pennsylvania, where it is still honored today with many local restaurants and civics groups offering goose dinners, local festivals, and other county-wide activities. In honor of the holiday, painted fibreglass goose statues can be found throughout the county all year long.

== Old Michaelmas Day ==
Old Michaelmas Day falls on 11 October (10 October according to some traditions: the dates are the result of the shift from the Julian to the Gregorian calendar, so that the gap widens by a day every century except the current one, and the celebration of Old Michaelmas Day may move in line with this). It is said that the Devil fell out of Heaven on this date, and fell into a blackberry bush, cursing the fruit as he fell. According to an old legend, blackberries should not be picked after this date (see above). In Yorkshire, it is said that the devil spat on them. According to Morrell (1977), this old legend is well known in all parts of Great Britain, even as far north as the Orkney Islands. In Cornwall, a similar legend prevails; however, the saying goes that the devil urinated on them.

== See also ==
- Michaelmas daisy
- Scottish term days
- St Michael and All Angels Church
- Turamichele
