= Kolar Gold Fields =

- Location in Karnataka, India
- Coordinates: 12.962°N 78.271°E
- Country: India
- State: Karnataka
- District: Kolar

Government
  - Type: City Municipal Council
  - Body: Robertsonpet City Municipal Council, K.G.F.

Area
  - Total: 58.1234 km^{2} (22.4416 sq mi)
- Elevation: 848 m (2,782 ft)

Population (2011)
  - Total: 163,643
  - Density: 2,815.44/km^{2} (7,291.96/sq mi)

Languages
  - Official: Kannada
- Time zone: UTC+5:30 (IST)
- PIN: 563115 -563122
- Telephone code: 08153
- Vehicle registration: KA 08
- Nearest city: Kolar, Bangalore, Chikkaballapur
- Lok Sabha constituency: Kolar Lok Sabha constituency
- Vidhan Sabha constituency: Kolar Gold Field Assembly constituency
- Avg. summer temperature: 32 °C (90 °F)
- Avg. winter temperature: 12 °C (54 °F)
- Website: http://www.robertsonpetcity.mrc.gov.in/

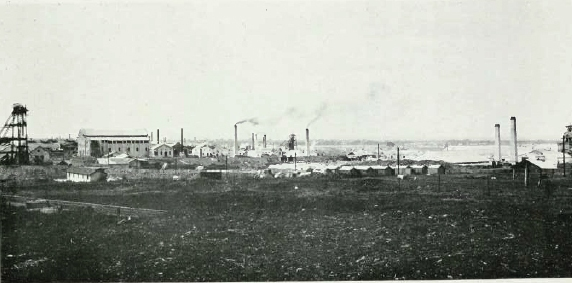
Kolar Gold Fields, 1913

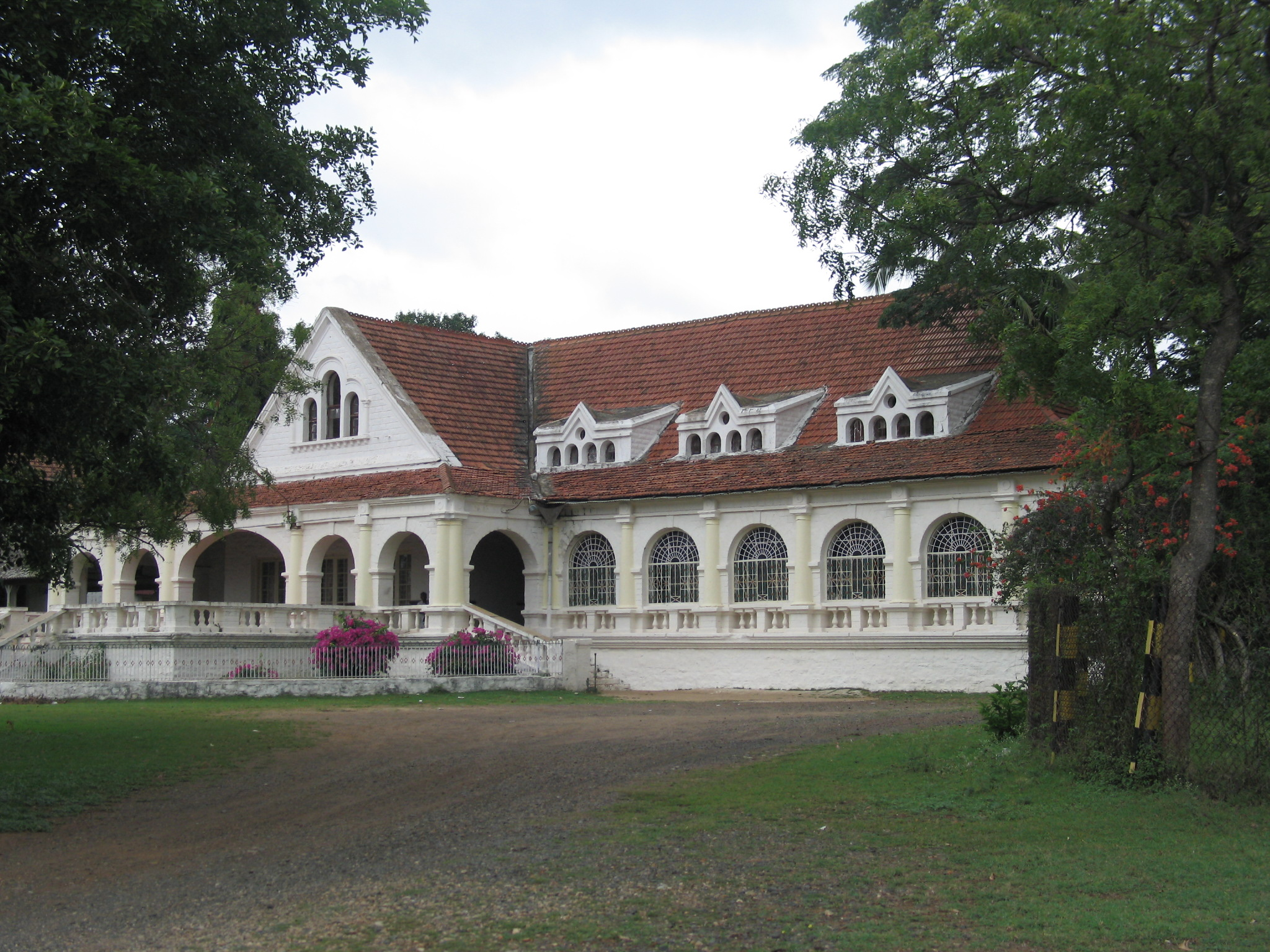
KGF Club

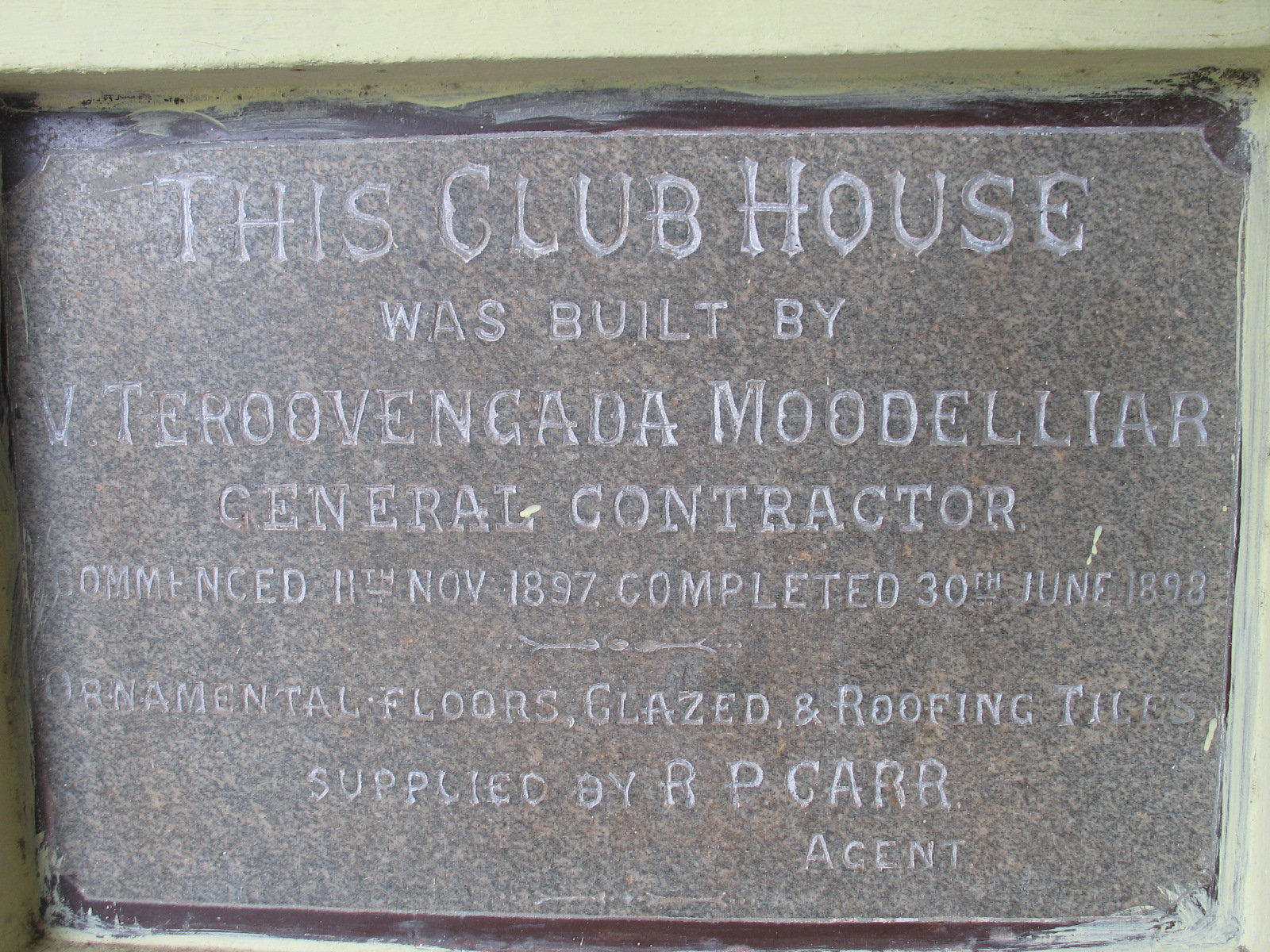
Plaque at club entrance

KGF Taluk Map

Kolar Gold Fields (K.G.F.) is a mining region in K.G.F. taluk (township), Kolar district, Karnataka, India. It is headquartered in Robertsonpet, where employees of Bharat Gold Mines Limited (BGML) and BEML Limited (formerly Bharat Earth Movers Limited) and their families live. K.G.F. is about 30 kilometres (19 mi) from Kolar, 100 kilometres (62 mi) from Bengaluru, capital of Karnataka, India. Over a century, the town has been known for gold mining. The mine closed on 28 February 2001 due to a fall in gold prices, despite gold still being present there. One of India's first power-generation units was built in 1889 to support mining operations. The mine complex hosted some particle physics experiments between the 1960s and 1992.

== History ==
The history of the Kolar Gold Fields was compiled by Fred Goodwill, superintendent of the Police, Maldives and Kolar Gold Fields. Goodwill's studies were published in the Quarterly Journal of the Mythic Society and elsewhere.

Patrons of Jainism, the Western Ganga Dynasty founded Kolar in the second century CE. For as long as they were in power (nearly 1,000 years) they used the title "Kuvalala-Puravareshwara" (Lord of Kolar), even after they moved their capital to Talakadu. From Talakadu, the Western Gangas ruled Gangavadi.

Kolar came under Chola rule in 1004. Following their usual naming system, the Cholas called the district Nikarilichola-mandala. Around 1117, the Hoysalas (under Vishnuvardhana) captured Talakadu and Kolar and drove the Cholas from the Kingdom of Mysore. Vira Someshwara divided the empire between his two sons in 1254, and Kolar was given to Ramanatha.

The Western Gangas made Kolar their capital and ruled Mysore, Coimbatore, Salem. Around the 13th century, the sage Pavananthi Munivar wrote Nannool about Tamil grammar at the Ulagamadhi cave.

Under Chola rule, King Uththama Chola is said to have built the temple to Renuka. The Chola rulers Veera Chola, Vikrama Chola and Raja Nagendra Chola built stone structures with inscriptions at Avani, Mulbagal, and Sitti Bettta. Chola inscriptions indicate the rule of Adithya Chola I (871–907), Raja Raja Chola I and Rajendra Chola I of Kolar, referring to Kolar as "Nikarili Cholamandalam" and "Jayam Konda Chola Manadalam". Inscriptions of Rajendra Chola I appear on the Kolaramma temple. Many Siva temples were built in Kolar under the Cholas, such as the Someshwarar and Sri Uddhandeshwari Temples in the village of Marikuppam, the Eswaran Temple in Oorugaumpet, and the Sivan Temple in the village of Madivala. Chola rule of Kolar lasted until 1116. Chola inscriptions have been neglected and vandalised. According to B. Lewis Rice, names and events have been confused.

Vijaynagar rule of Kolar lasted from 1336 to 1664. During the 17th century, Kolar came under Maratha rule as part of the jagir of Shahaji for fifty years before it was ruled by the Muslims for seventy years. In 1720, Kolar became part of the province of Sira; Fath Muhammad, the father of Hyder Ali, was faujdar of the province. Kolar was then ruled by the Marathas, the Nawab of Cuddapah, the Nizam of Hyderabad, and Hyder Ali. Ruled by the British from 1768 to 1770, it passed again to the Marathas and then to Hyder Ali. In 1791, Lord Cornwallis conquered Kolar in 1791, returning it again to Mysore in the Treaty of Seringapatam the following year.

Inscriptions in the region indicate the reign of Mahavalis (Baanaas), Kadambas, Chalukyas, Pallava, Vaidumbaas, Rastrakutas, Cholas, Hoysalas and Mysore kings. B. Lewis Rice recorded 1,347 inscriptions in the district in the 10th volume of Epigraphia Carnatica. Of the inscriptions, 714 are in Kannada; 422 are in Tamil, and 211 in Telugu.

John Taylor III acquired a number of mines in K.G.F. in 1880, and his firm (John Taylor & Sons) operated them until 1956; the Mysore Gold Mining Company was a subsidiary. In 1902, the mines were electrified with a 140-kilometre (87 mi) cable run by General Electric from the hydroelectric power plant at Shivanasamudra Falls. The government of Mysore took over the mines in 1956.

== Origin of the city ==
With the growth of the gold mines requiring more labour, people from the Dharmapuri, Krishnagiri, Salem and North and South Arcot districts of Tamil Nadu and the Chittoor, Annamaya and Sri Sathya Sai districts of Andhra Pradesh settled nearby; the settlements began to form the outskirts of K.G.F. The well-to-do families of British and Indian engineers, geologists, and mine supervisors lived in the centre of town. Robertsonpet and Andersonpet townships are named after two British mine officials.

Aalamaram is a district or ward within Kolar Gold Fields, near Palar Nagar, Hanumantha Nagar, and Officer's Quarters.

The establishment of BEML Limited expanded the city, providing employment and attracting new residents.

== National geological monument ==
The pyroclastic and pillow lava at Kolar Gold Fields have been declared a National Geological Monument by the Geological Survey of India (GSI) for their protection, maintenance, and encouragement of geotourism.

== Demographics ==
The official language is Kannada, and Tamil is spoken widely. Most of the Tamil population trace their ancestry to labourers brought by the British from the North Arcot, Chittoor, Salem and Dharmapuri districts of the Madras Presidency during the late 19th century. Substantial Anglo-Indian and Arcot Mudaliar populations are descendants of mine supervisors.

== Mine closures ==
The Kolar gold mines were nationalized in 1956, and provided a total of over 900 tonnes of gold. They were closed by the Indian government on 28 February 2001 for environmental and economic reasons; food, water and shelter were scarce, and production did not justify the investment.

== Education ==
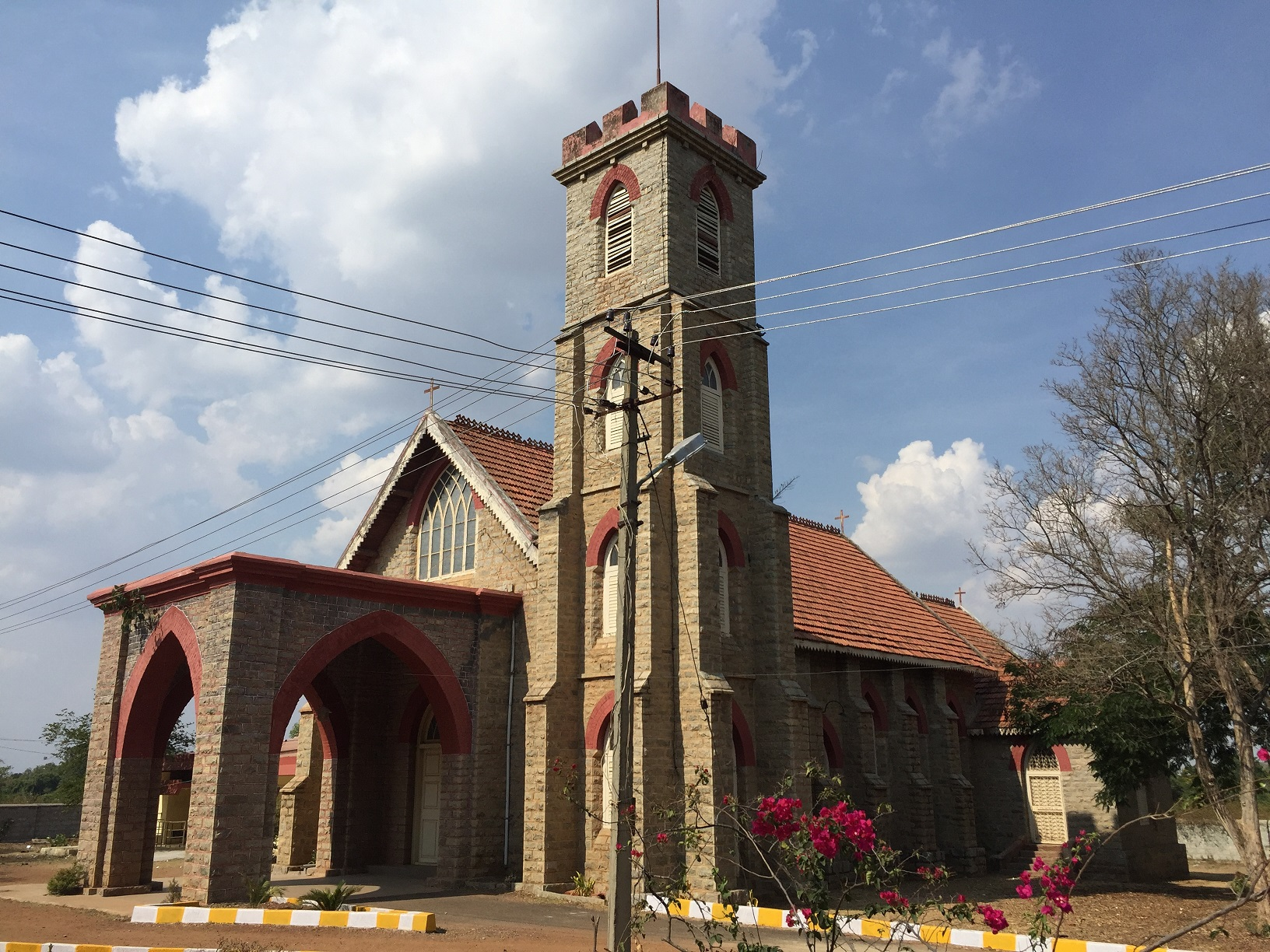
St. Michael's and All Angels' Church

In 1901, an English-language primary school was founded by John Taylor and Sons at the Nandydoorg Mine to educate the children of British and European employees. It became known as the Kolar Gold Fields Boys School, and was upgraded to a middle and high school; students took the Senior Cambridge examinations. The school was co-educational at the primary level.

On 15 January 1904, the Sisters of St. Joseph of Tarbes founded an English-language school for Europeans and Anglo-Indians for 22 girls. St. Mary's Boys School was also founded. The boys' school later moved to Andersonpet.

In 1933, the Order of the St. Joseph of Tarbes founded St. Theresa's School in Robertsonpet; St. Sebastian's School was founded in Coromandel a decade later. Both schools offered English lessons. To educate the growing Marwari population, the Sumathi Jain High School was founded in Robertsonpet. K.G.F. has several schools and colleges, including the St Charles School, the Government First Grade College, KGF College of Dental Science and Hospital, Sambhram Institute of Hotel Management, the Dr. T. Thimmaiah Institute of Technology, and the Sri Kengal Hanumanthaiya Law College, Don Bosco Technical Institute.

== Climate ==
Climate data for Kolar Gold Fields (1981–2010, extremes 1972–2002)
| Month | Jan | Feb | Mar | Apr | May | Jun | Jul | Aug | Sep | Oct | Nov | Dec | Year |
|---|---|---|---|---|---|---|---|---|---|---|---|---|---|
| Record high °C (°F) | 30.5 (86.9) | 33.4 (92.1) | 38.3 (100.9) | 39.7 (103.5) | 38.2 (100.8) | 38.5 (101.3) | 34.5 (94.1) | 33.4 (92.1) | 33.7 (92.7) | 32.5 (90.5) | 31.1 (88.0) | 29.9 (85.8) | 39.7 (103.5) |
| Mean daily maximum °C (°F) | 26.4 (79.5) | 29.6 (85.3) | 32.5 (90.5) | 34.1 (93.4) | 34.0 (93.2) | 30.8 (87.4) | 29.6 (85.3) | 29.0 (84.2) | 29.3 (84.7) | 27.8 (82.0) | 26.3 (79.3) | 25.1 (77.2) | 29.5 (85.1) |
| Mean daily minimum °C (°F) | 15.0 (59.0) | 16.4 (61.5) | 18.7 (65.7) | 21.3 (70.3) | 21.7 (71.1) | 20.6 (69.1) | 20.1 (68.2) | 19.8 (67.6) | 19.7 (67.5) | 19.2 (66.6) | 17.5 (63.5) | 15.8 (60.4) | 18.8 (65.8) |
| Record low °C (°F) | 10.0 (50.0) | 10.5 (50.9) | 12.4 (54.3) | 15.7 (60.3) | 17.5 (63.5) | 15.4 (59.7) | 17.3 (63.1) | 17.1 (62.8) | 16.2 (61.2) | 13.6 (56.5) | 12.0 (53.6) | 9.4 (48.9) | 9.4 (48.9) |
| Average rainfall mm (inches) | 3.5 (0.14) | 3.7 (0.15) | 19.4 (0.76) | 34.6 (1.36) | 98.4 (3.87) | 77.9 (3.07) | 81.7 (3.22) | 104.6 (4.12) | 212.4 (8.36) | 138.9 (5.47) | 76.7 (3.02) | 27.2 (1.07) | 879.1 (34.61) |
| Average rainy days | 0.3 | 0.4 | 1.2 | 2.4 | 5.5 | 3.9 | 4.9 | 6.3 | 8.0 | 7.4 | 5.1 | 2.2 | 47.6 |
| Average relative humidity (%) (at 17:30 IST) | 49 | 37 | 32 | 38 | 48 | 56 | 58 | 61 | 63 | 68 | 67 | 63 | 53 |
Source: India Meteorological Department

== See also ==
- Hutti Gold Mines Limited
- Kolar (Lok Sabha constituency)
- K.G.F: The movie
- Panic of 1873
- Thangalaan
