= Maurice J. McDonough High School =

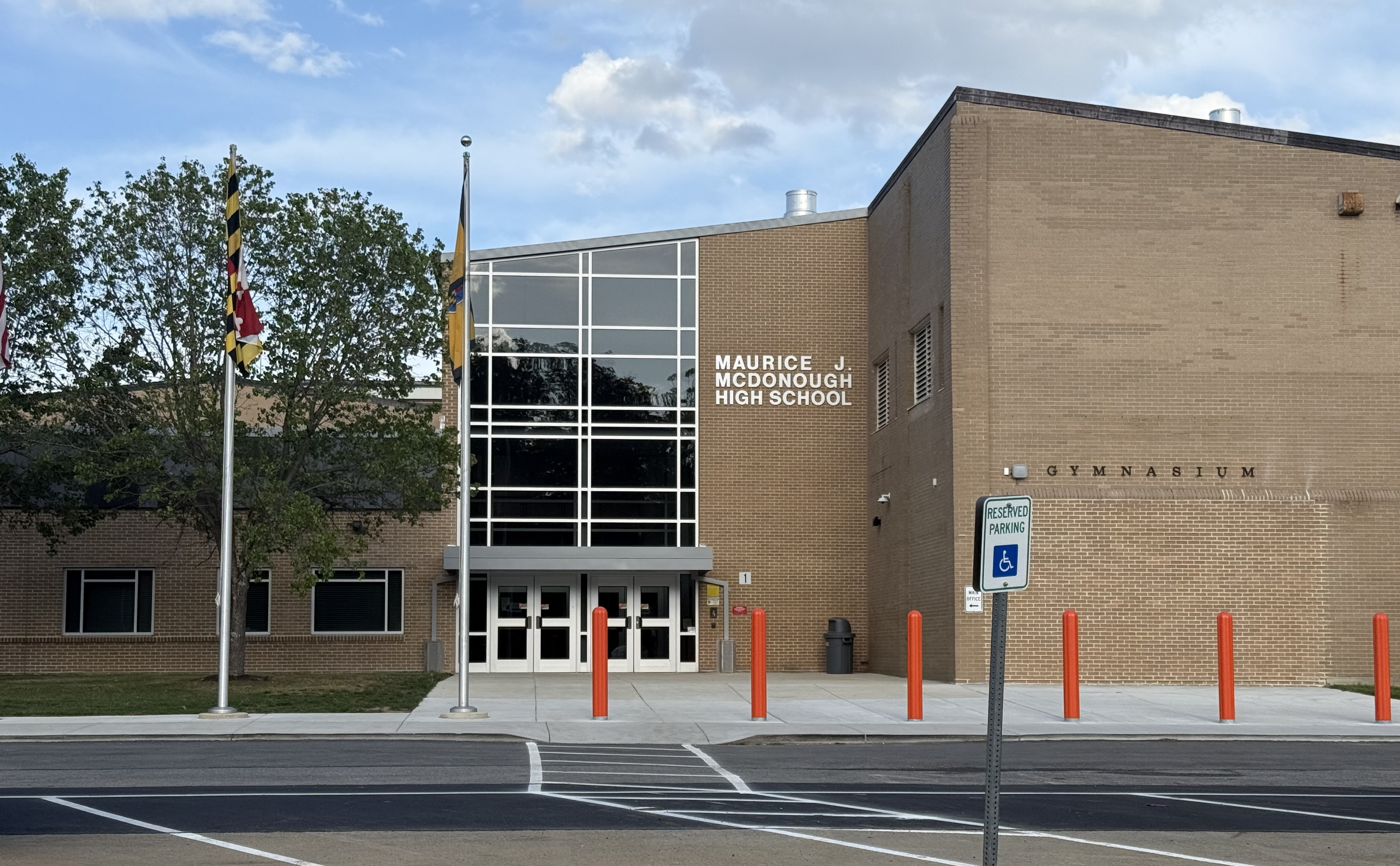

Location
- 7165 Marshall Corner Road; Pomfret, Maryland 20675; United States; 38°33′9″N 77°2′9″W

Information
- School type: Public, secondary school
- Motto: Docere Cognoscere et Excellere (To Teach, To Learn, To Excel)
- Founded: 1977
- School district: Charles County Public Schools
- Principal: Darnell Russell
- Teaching staff: 64.00 (FTE)
- Grades: 9–12
- Enrollment: 1230
- Student to teacher ratio: 14.17
- Language: English, Spanish, French
- Campus: Rural
- Colors: Purple, Orange and White ███
- Song: "Purple Rain" by Prince
- Athletics conference: Southern Maryland Athletic Conference
- Mascot: Rams
- Rival: La Plata High School
- Newspaper: The Rampage
- Website: www.ccboe.com/schools/mcdonough/

Maurice J. McDonough High School is a high school or secondary school in Pomfret, Maryland, United States and is run through the Charles County Public Schools system. It has approximately 1,230 students and 80 employees.

The school, built in 1976, is named for Maurice James McDonough, who was an early educator in Charles County, Maryland.

== History ==
Maurice James McDonough was an Irish immigrant and shop owner who settled in Pomfret prior to the American Revolution. After becoming aware of illiteracy in Charles County, McDonough stipulated that his assets be sold and used to fund education in the county following his death. After his death in 1804, these funds were used to fund teachers across the county. In 1903, these funds were further used to establish the McDonough Institute in La Plata, which became the first high school in Charles County. The McDonough Institute closed in 1927 following the opening of La Plata High School.

Maurice J. McDonough High School opened in the late 1970s. In 2014, community members petitioned for renovations to the school, which have occurred in the 2020s.

== Demographics ==
As of 2024, the racial makeup of the school is:

- 53% African American
- 26% White
- 13% Hispanic
- 6% Two or more races
- 2% Asian

The school is 51% female and 49% male.

33% of students receive free or reduced lunch, and 11% of students are disabled.

== Academics ==
Advanced Placement programs and extracurricular activities are offered at McDonough.

The U.S. Army is the represented branch for McDonough's JROTC program.

=== Vocational programs ===
McDonough, along with North Point High School, hosts Career and Technical Education (CTE) Programs available to Charles County students.

The following programs are hosted at McDonough:

- Curriculum for Agricultural Science Education (CASE)
- Dance
- Interactive Media
- Theatre

== Sports ==
2A State football champions in 2010, coached by Luke Ethington, as well as state championship wins in 1983, 1985, and 1990.

USBands 2A Maryland State Champions in 2015, coached by Caitlin Dunleavy.

The cheer team won the Class 1A state championship in 2023.

MPSSAA 2A State Softball champions in 1995, 1996, 1997, 1998.

Unified track and field champions Division 3 state champions, alongside Thomas Stone High School, at Special Olympics Maryland 2026.

== Notable incidents ==
In September 1988, 78 students were injured following the collapse of bleachers during a back-to-school program.

In March 2024, detectives from the Charles County Sheriff's Office and the school resource officer investigated a "fight club" at the school after an assault and robbery occurred in a school bathroom. Two students were arrested and charged with second-degree assault and robbery.

== Notable alumni and faculty ==
=== Faculty ===
- Larry Johnson, American football coach

=== Alumni ===
- Angela M. Houtz, victim of the September 11th attacks
- Donta Jones, American football player
- William Kwenkeu, American football player (before transferring to St. Charles High School)
- Robert Lowery, basketball player
- Matthew Morgan, politician
- Matt Sallee, singer
- A.J. Wallace, American football player
