= Charles County Public Schools =

School system in Maryland, US

Address
- 5980 Radio Station Rd La Plata, Charles, Maryland, 20646; United States
- Coordinates: 38°32′53″N 76°56′55″W

District information
- Type: Public
- Grades: Pre-K–12 (including Head Start)
- Established: October 17, 1916; 110 years ago
- Superintendent: Dr. Maria Navarro (since July 2021)
- Deputy superintendent(s): Kevin Lowndes (since July 2021)
- School board: Charles County Board of Education
- Chair of the board: Chairperson: Nicole Kreamer; Vice-Chairperson: Samiche Thomas
- Governing agency: Maryland State Department of Education
- Schools: 209
- Budget: US$408 million fiscal year 2022
- NCES District ID: 2400270

Students and staff
- Students: 26,875 (2021–2022)
- Teachers: 2,091 (2021–2022)
- Staff: 3,755 (2021–2022)
- Student–teacher ratio: 12:1 (2021-22)

Other information
- Schedule: Mondays-Fridays (with the exception of inclement weather, federal holidays, Election Day and teacher in-service days)
- Website: www.ccboe.com

The Charles County school system (CCPS) is a public school system run by the publicly-elected Charles County Board of Education and is funded by Charles County, Maryland through taxpayer money allocated by the Charles County Board of Commissioners.

Located south of Washington, D.C., in Charles County, Maryland, The stated mission of CCPS is "to provide an opportunity for all school-aged children to receive an academically challenging, quality education that builds character, equips for leadership and prepares for life, in an environment that is safe and conducive to learning."

== History ==
Public education in Charles County started in the late 1860s with the construction of one-room school houses across the county. These schools continued to be built until the 1920s, and were in use until the 1950s. The Charles County Public School system was established in 1916. In 1926, a tornado struck the town of La Plata, destroying the La Plata Elementary School and killing 13 children.

Schools in Charles County were segregated by race. All-Black schools in the county included the McConchie One-Room School (now an exhibit at the Charles County Fair) and Pomonkey High School, which later became Matthew Henson Middle School. The all-Black Bel Alton High School, which operated from 1938 to 1966, was added to the National Register of Historic Places in 2025. Schools began to be integrated during the 1966-67 school year after the 1954 U.S. Supreme Court decision in Brown v. Board of Education and the passage of the Civil Rights Act of 1964. Racial tensions continued with student protests against racial injustice occurring at La Plata High School in 1969.

Established in 1903, the first high school in the county was the McDonough Institute, the predecessor to Maurice J. McDonough High School. The McDonough Institute closed in 1927 after the establishment of La Plata High School.

The county's first charter school, the Phoenix International School of the Arts, opened in 2023.

== Board of Education ==
An eight-member elected Board of Education serves the educational needs and interests of Charles County. The board is made up of 1 at-large member, 8 board members and 1 student member (the Superintendent of Schools is elected/re-elected by the board members and not the public). The board establishes educational and fiscal policy, provides overall direction and governs Charles County Public Schools. Board members serve four-year terms. The Student Board member serves a one-year term, unless otherwise noted. The next election for all Board Members, as well as the Chairperson and Vice Chairperson, is in November 2026, while the next election for the At-Large member is in November 2028.

Following legislation passed in the 2021 Maryland General Assembly Regular Session, the Board of Education will consist of 10 members following the 2022 Maryland gubernatorial election. The school board will have 1 at-large member, 2 members from each commissioner district (8 total), and 1 voting student member. The student member gained a vote in all matters except capital and operating budgets, personnel decisions, and a few other minor exclusions. The legislation also restricted board members to serving no more than 3 consecutive terms.

Name	Seat	Elected (most recently)	Term ends	Length of service	Notes
Maria Navarro, Ed.D*	Superintendent of Schools	June 2025	June 2029	2nd Term	First elected by the board in June 2021 and began serving as superintendent on July 1, 2021; Navarro was re-elected for a second term in June 2025 which began on July 1, 2025, taking her tenure as superintendent through June 2029, where the board will vote on a possible third term if Navarro chooses to continue her tenure.
Nicole Kreamer**	Chairperson	November 2022	December 2026	1st Term	Elected to Chairperson position in January 2026.
Samichie Thomas***	Vice Chairperson	October 2023	December 2026	1st Term	Chosen by the board to replace Cindy Coulby, who resigned from her position in January 2023. Elected to Vice Chairperson position in January 2026. Thomas will not seek a second term as she is running for county commissioner. Of no relation to Brenda Thomas.
Letonya Smalls, Ed.D	At-Large	November 2024	December 2028	1st Term	Will not seek a second term.
Dottery Butler-Washington	Board Member	November 2022	December 2026	1st Term	
David Hancock	Board Member	November 2022	December 2026	2nd Term	First elected in November 2018. In 2025, Hancock announced that he would not seek re-election, but would serve out the remainder of his second term. Hancock was the first of the current board members to announce his departure.
Yonelle Moore Lee, Esq.	Board Member	November 2022	December 2026	1st Term	Will not seek a second term.
Bridgette Patterson	Board Member	October 2025	December 2026	1st Term	Filling a vacant seat formerly held by Linda Warren of Commissioner District 4, who resigned on August 1, 2025. Patterson will not seek a second term.
Jamila Smith	Board Member	November 2022	December 2026	1st Term	
Brenda Thomas	Board Member	November 2022	December 2026	1st Term	Will not seek a second term as she is running for county commissioner. Of no relation to Samiche Thomas.
Munachi Obinali	Student Member	June 2026	June 2027	2nd Term	

* denotes Superintendent of Schools.

** denotes Chairperson of Board of Education.

*** denotes Vice Chairperson of Board of Education.

== Student Member of the Board ==
The Charles County Board of Education is one of few Boards of Education in the nation to have a voting Student Board member. The Student Member of the board has a vote on all matters except capital and operating budgets, personnel decisions, and a few other minor exclusions.

Student Members of the Charles County Board of Education
Name	School	Term	Number	Comments
Benjamin Young	La Plata High School	1994-95	1st	
Tia Gripper	Westlake High School	1995-96	2nd	
Danny Alley	Not Listed	1996-97	3rd	
Desire Voinche	Not Listed	1997-98	4th	
Jasmine Hyejung Yoon	Westlake High School	1998-99	5th	
Aaron Merki	McDonough High School	1999-00	6th	
Avery Posey, Jr.	Lackey High School	2000-01	7th	
Lindsey Adkisson	La Plata High School	2001-03	8th and 9th	Served 2 terms.
Smiti Nathan	Thomas Stone High School	2003-04	10th	
C. J. Caniglia	Thomas Stone High School	2004-05	11th	
Brian Frazee	Thomas Stone High School	2005-06	12th	
Andrew Van Woerkom	Westlake High School	2006-07	13th	
Ashin Shah	Thomas Stone High School	2007-08	14th	
Diane Berringer	McDonough High School	2008-09	15th	
Kyle Grusholt	McDonough High School	2009-10	16th	
Emmanuel Bakare	Thomas Stone High School	2010-11	17th	
Taylor Brooks	Westlake High School	2011-12	18th	
Azeezat Adeleke	North Point High School	2012-13	19th	
Amit Patel	McDonough High School	2013-14	20th	
Georgia Benson	Westlake High School	2014-15	21st	
Pearson Benson	Westlake High School	2015-16	22nd	Brother of Georgia Benson.
Da'Juon Washington	North Point High School	2016-17	23rd	
Drew Carter	St. Charles High School	2017-18	24th	1st Student member from St. Charles High School.
Krisha Patel	Westlake High School	2018-19	25th	
DeJuan Woods	Thomas Stone High School	2019-20	26th	
Ian Herd	La Plata High School	2020-22	27th*	1st voting Student member; served 2 terms.
Amira Abujuma	North Point High School	2022-23	28th	
Treasure Perkins	Thomas Stone High School	2023-24	29th	
Sam Virk	North Point High School	2024-25	30th	
Munachi Obinali	La Plata High School	2025-27	31st	Reelected in 2026.

* While Lindsey Adkisson's two terms were counted separately, Ian Herd's were counted together.

== Schools ==
=== High schools ===
- La Plata (La Plata)
- Henry E. Lackey (Indian Head)
- Maurice J. McDonough (Pomfret)
- North Point (Waldorf)
- St. Charles (Waldorf)
- Thomas Stone (Waldorf)
- Westlake (Waldorf)

=== Middle schools ===
- Theodore G. Davis (Waldorf)
- Glymont (Potomac Heights)
- John Hanson (Waldorf)
- Matthew Henson (Pomonkey)
- Mattawoman (Waldorf)
- Piccowaxen (Newburg)
- Milton M. Somers (La Plata)
- Benjamin Stoddert (St. Charles)

=== Elementary schools ===
- C. Paul Barnhart (Waldorf)
- Berry (Waldorf)
- Billingsley (White Plains)
- Dr. Gustavus Brown (Waldorf)
- Dr. James Craik (Pomfret)
- William A. Diggs (Waldorf)
- Gale-Bailey (Marbury)
- Dr. Thomas L. Higdon (Newburg)
- Indian Head (Indian Head)
- Daniel of St. Thomas Jenifer (Waldorf)
- Malcolm (Malcolm)
- T.C. Martin (Bryantown)
- Mary H. Matula (La Plata)
- Arthur Middleton (Waldorf)
- Walter J. Mitchell (La Plata)
- Mt. Hope/Nanjemoy (Nanjemoy)
- Dr. Samuel A. Mudd (Waldorf)
- Mary Burgess Neal (Waldorf)
- J.C. Parks (Pomonkey)
- J.P. Ryon (Waldorf)
- Margaret J. Thornton (White Plains)
- Eva Turner (St. Charles)
- William B. Wade (Waldorf)

=== Charter schools ===
- Phoenix International School of the Arts (La Plata) (Note: As a charter school, PISOTA is autonomous but is a part of the Charles County Public Schools system, receives public funding, and is overseen by the Charles County Board of Education.) (Note: PISOTA serves grades 6 - 8 as a middle school.)

=== Other ===
- Special Education Department, Assistive Technology Center
- Adult Education Services, External Diploma Program, Adult Services Center
- Early Learning Center
- F.B. Gwynn Educational Center
- Judy Center
- Adult Education Services, Lifelong Learning Center
- Nanjemoy Creek Environmental Education Center
- Robert D. Stethem Educational Center
- James E. Richmond Science Center

== See also ==
- College of Southern Maryland – public community college with campuses across Southern Maryland, including Charles County
- Southern Maryland Athletic Conference – athletic league whose members include Charles County high schools
- List of school districts in Maryland
