= Rod Milstead =

American football player and coach (born 1969)

No. 69
- Position: Guard

Personal information
- Born: November 10, 1969 (age 56); Washington, D.C., U.S.
- Listed height: 6 ft 2 in (1.88 m)
- Listed weight: 290 lb (132 kg)

Career information
- High school: Lackey (Indian Head, Maryland)
- College: Delaware State
- NFL draft: 1992: 5th round, 121st overall pick

Career history

Playing
- Dallas Cowboys (1992)*; Cleveland Browns (1992–1993); San Francisco 49ers (1994–1997); Washington Redskins (1998–1999); Denver Broncos (2000)*
- * Offseason or practice squad member only

Coaching
- Lackey HS (MD) (2000–2006) Assistant head coach/offensive line; North Carolina Central (2013) Offensive line; Delaware State (2014) Offensive line; La Plata HS (MD) (2015–2017) Head coach; Delaware State) (2018–2022) Head coach

Awards and highlights
- Super Bowl champion (XXIX); Division I-AA All-American (1991); First-team All-MEAC (1989, 1990, 1991); Delaware State (2018–2022) Head coach

Career NFL statistics
- Games played: 56
- Games started: 23
- Stats at Pro Football Reference

Roderick Leon Milstead Jr. (born November 10, 1969) is an American football coach and former player. He played professionally as a guard in the National Football League (NFL) for the Cleveland Browns, San Francisco 49ers and Washington Redskins. He played college football for the Delaware State Hornets. After his playing career, he became the head coach at Delaware State.

== Early life ==
Milstead attended Lackey High School, where he was a two-time All-State offensive lineman and helped lead his team to a Class B state championship in 1986. He participated in the Big 33 Football Classic game between the Maryland and Pennsylvania All-stars. He also played Basketball and was valuable member of the Track & Field team that won the 1987 Class B State Championship.

He accepted a football scholarship from Delaware State University, where he became a four-year starter at left guard. As a junior, he helped Delaware State average 298.7 rushing yards per game and 5.2 yards per rush. Finishing the season as the NCAA Division I-AA No. 2 ranked rushing offense, including a school record 518-yard rushing performance against Towson State University. As a senior, he helped his team register 380 yards rushing against Northeastern University.

He never missed a game or a practice, while making 42 straight starts at left guard. He was selected first-team All-MEAC three straight years and also received Division I-AA All-American honors in 1991.

In 2003, he was inducted into the Delaware State Athletic Hall of Fame. 2021 Mid Eastern Athletic Conference (MEAC) Hall of Fame Inductee.

== Professional career ==
=== Dallas Cowboys ===
Milstead was selected by the Dallas Cowboys in the fifth round of the 1992 NFL draft. On August 25, he was traded to the Cleveland Browns in exchange for a conditional draft choice (not exercised).

=== Cleveland Browns ===
On September 3, 1992, he was placed on the injured reserve list with a nerve problem in his back. He was released by the Cleveland Browns on September 1, 1993. He was later re-signed and spent 11 games on the inactive list. He was waived on August 28, 1994.

=== San Francisco 49ers ===
Milstead was signed by the San Francisco 49ers on September 15, 1994. The next year, he started a career-high 12 games.

He was released at the end of training camp on August 25, 1997 and later re-signed in October, that season he went on to appear in 4 games and was inactive in 5.

=== Washington Redskins ===
On March 3, 1998, he was signed as a free agent by the Washington Redskins and went on to start 11 games. In 1999, he was inactive for the first 5 games, before being released on October 23. He was re-signed on November 9, 1999, after Keith Sims was injured.

=== Denver Broncos ===
In 2000, he signed with the Denver Broncos and was released on August 17.

== Personal life ==
Milstead coached the Lackey High School football team to 2 state appearances at Ravens stadium. He coached the offensive line at Delaware State University. In 2016, he took over as the head football coach at La Plata High School in La Plata, Maryland. Milstead was named head football coach at Delaware State on January 30, 2018.

== Head coaching record ==
=== College ===
| Year | Team | Overall | Conference | Standing | Bowl/playoffs |
|---|---|---|---|---|---|
Delaware State Hornets (Mid-Eastern Athletic Conference) (2018–2022)
| 2018 | Delaware State | 3–8 | 2–5 | T–8th | |
| 2019 | Delaware State | 2–10 | 1–7 | 9th | |
| 2020–21 | Delaware State | 2–3 | 2–2 | 1st (North) | |
| 2021 | Delaware State | 5–6 | 2–3 | 3rd | |
| 2022 | Delaware State | 5–6 | 2–3 | T–3rd | |
| Delaware State: | | 17–33 | 9–30 | | |
| Total: | | 17–33 | | | |
