= Thomas Stone High School =

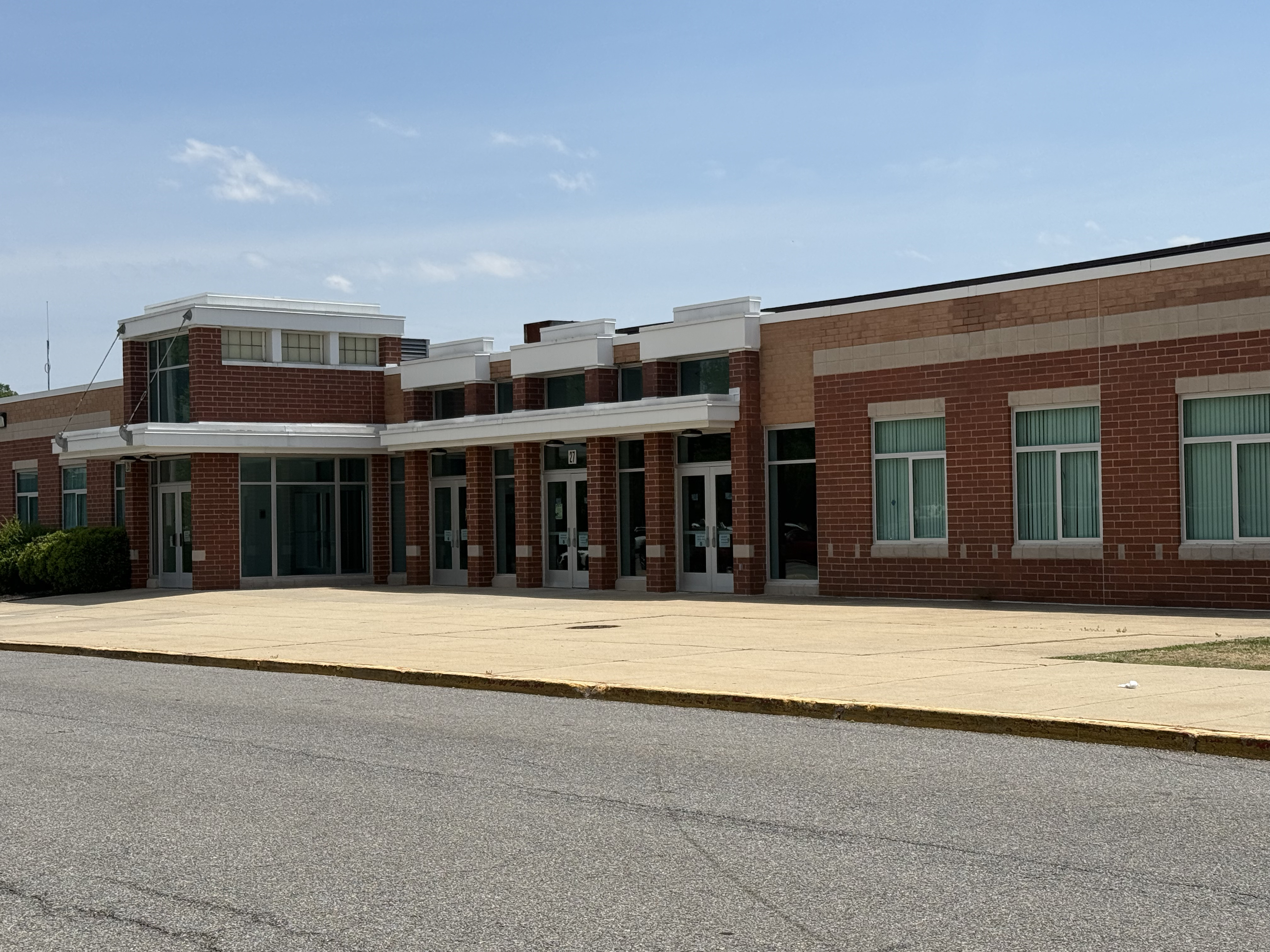

Location
- 3785 Leonardtown Road; Waldorf, Maryland 20601; United States; 38°36′54″N 76°53′9″W

Information
- School type: Public, secondary school
- Motto: None
- Founded: 1969
- School district: Charles County Public Schools
- Principal: Shanif Pearl
- Teaching staff: 85.00 (FTE)
- Grades: 9–12
- Enrollment: 1,168 (2017-18)
- Student to teacher ratio: 13.74
- Language: English
- Campus: Suburban/Rural
- Colors: Blue and Gold ██
- Athletics conference: Southern Maryland Athletic Conference
- Mascot: Cougars
- Website: https://stone.ccboe.com/

Thomas Stone High School is a public high school in the eastern section of Waldorf, Maryland, United States, administered by the Charles County Board of Education. The school colors are blue and gold and its mascot is the cougar. It was named after Thomas Stone, a Maryland representative in the signing of the Declaration of Independence.

== History ==
Thomas Stone was opened in 1969. Like Henry E. Lackey High School, Thomas Stone was constructed with some classrooms underground; these are the only two schools in Charles County to feature underground classrooms. Thomas Stone was renovated in the late 1990s, increasing its capacity from 1250 to 1600 students; the school is currently the third largest high school in Charles County, after North Point High School and St. Charles High School (the population of Thomas Stone dropped to 1200 after North Point and St. Charles opened).

== Sports ==
Thomas Stone is known for its basketball program. The boys basketball team won back to back 4A East regional titles in 2007-2008 and 2008-2009.

In baseball six alumni were drafted by Major League Baseball; with Mark Calvert and Tim Drummond reaching the big league.

== Alumni ==
- Tim Drummond, professional baseball player
- Robert Stethem, US Navy diver and terrorism victim
