= Erick Hunter =

American football player (born 2003)

No. 49 – New England Patriots
- Position: Linebacker
- Roster status: Active

Personal information
- Born: February 26, 2003 (age 23); Capitol Heights, Maryland, U.S.
- Listed height: 6 ft 2 in (1.88 m)
- Listed weight: 225 lb (102 kg)

Career information
- High school: Westlake (Waldorf, Maryland)
- College: Morgan State (2021–2025)
- NFL draft: 2026: undrafted

Career history
- Detroit Lions (2026)*; New England Patriots (2026–present)
- * Offseason or practice squad member only

Career NFL statistics as of 2026
- Total tackles: 3
- Stats at Pro Football Reference

Erick Hunter (born February 26, 2003) is an American professional football linebacker for the New England Patriots of the National Football League (NFL). He played college football for the Morgan State Bears.

== Early life ==
Hunter attended Westlake High School in Waldorf, Maryland, and committed to play college football for the Morgan State Bears.

== College career ==
Hunter played college football at Morgan State from 2021 to 2025, finishing second in school history with 298 tackles in 45 games. In 2025, when he recorded 102 tackles with 14 for a loss, four sacks, three forced fumbles, a pass deflection, an interception, and a touchdown. Hunter earned first-team all-conference honors and FCS all-American honors. After the 2025 season, Hunter declared for the NFL draft.

== Professional career ==
Pre-draft measurables
Height	Weight	Arm length	Hand span	Wingspan	40-yard dash	10-yard split	20-yard split	20-yard shuttle	Three-cone drill	Vertical jump	Broad jump	Bench press
6 ft 2 3/8 in (1.89 m)	224 lb (102 kg)	33 1/8 in (0.84 m)	10 3/8 in (0.26 m)	6 ft 7 in (2.01 m)	4.48 s	1.57 s	2.62 s	4.21 s	7.40 s	37.0 in (0.94 m)	10 ft 10 in (3.30 m)	16 reps
All values from HBCU Combine

=== Detroit Lions ===
After going unselected in the 2026 NFL draft, Hunter signed with the Detroit Lions as an undrafted free agent. On August 30, 2026, he was waived by the Lions as a part of final roster cuts.

=== New England Patriots ===
On September 1, 2026, Hunter signed with the New England Patriots.
