= Randy Starks =

American football player and coach (born 1983)

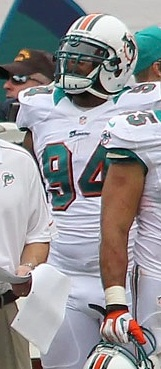
- Starks with the Miami Dolphins in 2012

Personal information
- Born: December 14, 1983 (age 42); Petersburg, Virginia, U.S.
- Listed height: 6 ft 4 in (1.93 m)
- Listed weight: 305 lb (138 kg)

Career information
- High school: Westlake (Waldorf, Maryland)
- College: Maryland (2001–2003)
- NFL draft: 2004: 3rd round, 71st overall pick

Career history

Playing
- Tennessee Titans (2004–2007); Miami Dolphins (2008–2014); Cleveland Browns (2015)

Coaching
- Henry E. Lackey HS (MD) (2020) Assistant coach; Manassas Park HS (VA) (2021) Head coach; LaGrange (2022) Defensive line coach; Loughborough College (2023) Defensive line coach; Eureka (2024–2025) Head coach; Maryland (2026-present) Defensive line coach

Awards and highlights
- 2× Pro Bowl (2010, 2012); First-team All-ACC (2003); Second-team All-ACC (2002)

Career NFL statistics
- Total tackles: 422
- Sacks: 42
- Forced fumbles: 2
- Fumble recoveries: 10
- Interceptions: 4
- Stats at Pro Football Reference

Head coaching record
- Career: College: 2–18 (.100); High school: 0–10 (.000)

Randolph Starks Jr. (born December 14, 1983) is an American college football coach and former player. He is currently the defensive line coach for Maryland, a position he has held since 2026. Starks played professionally as a defensive end for 12 seasons, from 2004 to 2015, in the National Football League (NFL) with the Tennessee Titans, Miami Dolphins, and Cleveland Browns. He played college football for the Maryland Terrapins. Starks was selected by the Titans in the third round of the 2004 NFL draft.

== Early life ==
An army brat, Starks spent the first five years of his life in Germany because his father, Randolph Sr., was stationed there with the United States Army. He was eventually re-deployed to Fort Belvoir in Virginia.

Starks attended Westlake High School in Waldorf, Maryland, where he was a letterman in football, basketball and track. In football, he was an honorable mention all-state selection as a junior defensive tackle after recording 67 tackles, six sacks and two forced fumbles. He was a SuperPrep All-American as a senior with 77 tackles, seven sacks and two forced fumbles. He also played offensive tackle during his final two seasons at Westlake. Starks finished his prep career with 194 tackles while ranking third in school history in sacks.

Starks also earned four letters competing in basketball and track. In basketball, he was the leading scorer and rebounder in the Southern Maryland Athletic Conference (SMAC) as a junior. As a senior, he led his team to a 23–3 record and was named Southern Maryland's Basketball Player of the Year by The Washington Post. He finished his career with 1,011 points scored and 682 rebounds. In track & field, Starks was a two-time state qualifier in both the shot put and discus throw. At the 2001 Maryland State Meet, he earned a second-place finish in the discus, with a throw of 43.28 meters (141 ft, 9 in), while also placing third in the shot put, with a throw of 15.80 meters (51 ft, 8 in). In addition, he reportedly bench-pressed 320 pounds and had a 32-inch vertical leap.

== College career ==
Following high school, Starks chose to attend the University of Maryland, College Park over schools such as Penn State and Virginia Tech. He wore No. 57 for the Maryland Terrapins football team.

Starks appeared in 11 games as a true freshman in 2001, including the Orange Bowl against Florida. During the season, he recorded 35 tackles (24 solo), seven tackles for a loss and 3.5 sacks. His performance earned him a fourth-team All-American selection by Sporting News. Starks was nominated for ACC Rookie of the Week honors following a game against Georgia Tech in which he recorded eight tackles, 1.5 sacks and forced a fumble in overtime.

As a sophomore in 2002, Starks appeared in all 14 games for the Terrapins including the Peach Bowl against Tennessee. He earned second-team All-ACC honors after recording 93 tackles, 6.5 sacks, 12.5 tackles for a loss, a forced fumble, a fumble recovery and six passes defensed. His tackle total ranked third on the team, his sack total second on the team while his 17 quarterback hurries led the team.

Prior to his junior season, Starks was named the preseason ACC Defensive Player of the Year by ESPN.com and was on the watchlist for the Lombardi Award and Outland Trophy. He appeared in 13 games for the Terrapins in 2003 on his way to first-team All-ACC honors. He finished the season with 74 tackles (39 solo), 15.5 tackles for a loss, 7.5 sacks, a forced fumble and three passes defensed. His tackles for a loss total led the team while ranking fourth in the conference. Starks was named ACC Defensive Lineman of the Week following a game against Virginia in which he had eight tackles (five solo), three tackles for a loss and a sack of quarterback Matt Schaub.

Starks decided to forgo his senior season at Maryland and instead declare for the 2004 NFL draft at the age of 20. A two-time All-ACC selection, he finished his college career with 38 games played, 201 tackles (111 solo), 34 tackles for a loss, 17.5 sacks, three forced fumbles, a fumble recovery, and nine passes defensed.

== Professional career ==
=== Pre-draft ===
Pre-draft measurables
Height	Weight	Arm length	Hand span	40-yard dash	20-yard shuttle	Three-cone drill	Vertical jump	Broad jump	Bench press
6 ft 3 3/8 in (1.91 m)	314 lb (142 kg)	33 1/2 in (0.85 m)	10 3/8 in (0.26 m)	5.08 s	4.60 s	7.32 s	33.0 in (0.84 m)	9 ft 4 in (2.84 m)	27 reps
All values from NFL Combine/Pro Day

Prior to the 2004 NFL draft, Starks attended the NFL Scouting Combine and met with the Atlanta Falcons, Carolina Panthers, Miami Dolphins, New England Patriots, Oakland Raiders and San Francisco 49ers. In April, he visited with the Kansas City Chiefs.

=== Tennessee Titans ===
Starks was drafted by the Tennessee Titans in the third round (71st overall) of the 2004 NFL draft. The pick used to draft him was acquired from the Houston Texans in a draft day trade. He was initially unable to attend offseason workouts due to a league rule preventing rookies from participating in team activities before their school year has been completed. Starks agreed to terms on a contract with the Titans on July 28. He wore No. 90 for the team.

As a rookie in 2004, Starks appeared in all but two games for the Titans and started eight games. He made his NFL debut on September 11 against the Miami Dolphins, sacking quarterback A. J. Feeley. During the season, he also sacked Carson Palmer (Bengals), Craig Krenzel (Bears) and David Carr (Texans). His 4.5 sacks on the year led all rookie defensive tackles, including six players – Tommie Harris, Vince Wilfork, Marcus Tubbs, Darnell Dockett, Junior Siavii, Tank Johnson – drafted before him. Additionally, he recorded 53 tackles, two forced fumbles, a fumble recovery, a pass defensed and a blocked field goal on the season. He forced fumbles against Krenzel and Peyton Manning (Colts) while blocking a Kris Brown kick against the Houston Texans.

"Right now I expect myself to be a factor, not just be a body out there but make a difference and help this team win."

— Randy Starks, August 2005

With the Titans reportedly impressed with Starks' rookie campaign, he worked with the first-team defense during the 2005 offseason. He wound up started all 16 regular season games for the Titans that season, recording 78 tackles and three sacks. His sacks came against Anthony Wright (Ravens), Marc Bulger (Rams) and Gus Frerotte (Dolphins).

In 2006, Starks appeared in all 16 games for the second straight season and started eight of them. He finished the year with 56 tackles, three sacks and a fumble recovery. In the season opener against the New York Jets, he recovered a Chad Pennington fumble that led to a Titans touchdown on the next play. Against the Philadelphia Eagles on November 19, Starks returned a Jeff Garcia fumble 26 yards before lateraling it to linebacker Keith Bulluck, who took it 16 more yards for a score. His sacks that season came against David Carr (Texans) and David Garrard (Jaguars).

A restricted free agent in the 2007 offseason, Starks was tendered a contract by the Titans on March 1. He went on to appear in 14 games for the Titans that season but started a career-low four games. He recorded 39 tackles and fumble recovery on the year but failed to record a sack for the first time in his career. In a Monday Night Football contest against the New Orleans Saints, he recovered a Drew Brees fumble forced by Travis LaBoy. He became an unrestricted free agent following the season.

=== Miami Dolphins ===
On February 29, 2008, Starks signed with the Miami Dolphins. He signed a five-year, $21 million contract with $7 million guaranteed. In April, it was reported he would see playing time at both right defensive end and nose tackle. In 2012, Starks joined Cameron Wake as the first two players in Dolphins history to earn Pro Bowl honors at two different positions (NT, DE). On March 11, 2015, the Dolphins released Starks making him a free agent.

=== Cleveland Browns ===
On March 16, 2015, Starks signed with the Cleveland Browns. On February 18, 2016, Starks was released. Starks's only season with the Browns ended with 29 tackles, one sack, and one fumble recovered.

== Coaching career ==
Starks is pursuing a master's degree from Georgetown University which he expects to finish up in the fall of 2022.

Starks coached football at Virginia's Manassas Park High School in 2020, as offensive and defensive line coach, and in 2021 as head coach. He resigned in August 2022 ahead of the school cancelling its upcoming season. He then worked at LaGrange College in LaGrange, Georgia as the defensive line coach. Starks was the head football coach at Eureka College in Eureka, Illinois. In 2026, Starks became the defensive line coach for the University of Maryland Terrapins.

== Legal issues ==
On May 24, 2009, Starks was arrested on Ocean Drive in South Beach, Miami after his vehicle made contact with a traffic officer during the busy Memorial Day Weekend festivities. All charges were dropped in July 2009.

In November 2016, Starks prevailed in a civil suit against the arresting officer after a jury determined that he was not liable for the events occurring during the traffic stop on May 24, 2009.

== Career statistics ==
=== Playing career ===
==== NFL ====
				Tackles								
Year	Team	GP	GS	Total	Solo	Ast	Sck	FF	FR	INT	PD	TD
2004	TEN	14	8	28	17	11	4.5	1	2	0	3	0
2005	TEN	16	16	47	34	13	3.0	0	0	0	1	0
2006	TEN	16	8	40	25	15	3.0	0	2	0	0	0
2007	TEN	14	4	16	11	5	0.0	0	1	0	1	0
2008	MIA	16	4	29	22	7	3.0	0	0	1	3	0
2009	MIA	16	16	56	42	14	7.0	0	1	0	0	0
2010	MIA	16	16	30	26	4	3.0	0	0	0	3	0
2011	MIA	16	15	34	28	6	4.5	0	0	2	4	0
2012	MIA	16	16	27	18	9	4.5	0	0	1	4	0
2013	MIA	16	14	49	36	13	4.0	1	1	0	1	0
2014	MIA	15	15	28	19	9	4.5	0	1	0	1	0
2015	CLE	15	15	29	14	15	1.0	0	1	0	0	0
Total		186	147	413	292	121	42.0	1	10	4	20	0

==== College ====
		Tackles									
Year	GP	Total	Solo	Ast	TFL	Sck	FF	FR	INT	PD	TD
2001	11	35	24	11	7	3.5	1	0	0	0	0
2002	14	93	49	44	12.5	6.5	1	1	0	6	0
2003	13	73	38	35	14.5	7.5	1	0	0	3	0
Total	38	201	111	90	34	17.5	3	1	0	9	0

== Head coaching record ==
=== College ===
Year	Team	Overall	Conference	Standing	Bowl/playoffs
Eureka Red Devils (Northern Athletics Collegiate Conference) (2024–2025)
2024	Eureka	0–10	0–8	9th	
2025	Eureka	2–8	1–7	8th	
Eureka:		2–18	1–15		
Total:		2–18			

=== High school ===
Year	Team	Overall	Conference	Standing	Bowl/playoffs
Manassas Park Cougars () (2021)
2021	Manassas Park	0–10	0–5	13th	
Manassas Park:		0–10	0–5		
Total:		0–10			
