= Gerel Simmons =

American basketball player (born 1993)

Free Agent
- Position: Shooting guard / Point guard
- League: Free Agent

Personal information
- Born: November 14, 1993 (age 33) Accokeek, Maryland, U.S.
- Listed height: 6 ft 2 in (1.88 m)
- Listed weight: 187 lb (85 kg)

Career information
- High school: North Point (Waldorf, Maryland)
- College: Brevard (2011–2013); Lincoln Memorial (2014–2016)
- NBA draft: 2016: undrafted
- Playing career: 2016–present

Career history
- 2016–2017: Rilski Sportist
- 2017: Ciclista Juninense
- 2017: Verdirrojo BBC
- 2017–2018: Ibar
- 2018: Al-Ittihad
- 2018–2019: Al-Ahli
- 2019–2020: UMF Tindastóll
- 2020: AS Douanes
- 2020–2021: Artland Dragons
- 2021: San Carlos
- 2021–2022: Lucentum Alicante
- 2022: Apollon Patras
- 2022: ERA Nymburk
- 2022–2023: Brose Bamberg
- 2023: Kolossos Rodou
- 2023–2025: Mersin MSK
- 2025: Orzi Basket
- 2025–2026: Bandırma Bordo Basketbol

Career highlights
- First-team All-SAC (2016)

Gerel David Simmons (born November 14, 1993) is an American professional basketball player. He played college basketball for Brevard College and Lincoln Memorial.

== High school career ==
Simmons attended North Point High School in Waldorf, Maryland.

== College career ==
Simmons played college basketball for Brevard College and Lincoln Memorial. He was selected at the first-team All-South Atlantic Conference in 2016.

== Professional career ==
Simmons started his career with Rilski Sportist of the NBL. On March 10, 2022, he joined Ciclista Juninense in Argentina.

After a short stint in Uruguay, he joined Ibar of the Montenegrin League. He finished the year with Al-Ittihad in Libya.

The 2019-20 season, Simmons played with UMF Tindastóll and AS Douanes. The following season, he played in Germany with Artland Dragons and with San Carlos in Dominican Republic. On August 21, 2022, Simmons signed with Lucentum Alicante of the LEB Oro.

On February 27, 2022, Simmons signed with Apollon Patras of the Greek Basket League. In 10 league games, he averaged 13.8 points, 3.1 rebounds and 2.6 assists in 29 minutes per contest.

On August 29, 2022, he signed with ERA Nymburk of the NBL.

On December 30, 2022, he signed with Brose Bamberg of the Basketball Bundesliga (BBL).

On August 20, 2023, Simmons returned to Greece for Kolossos Rodou. On November 15 of the same year, he was released from the Greek club after the acquisition of Andrew Goudelock. Following his departure, he joined Mersin MSK in Turkey. On June 26, 2024, he extended his contract with the club, after the promotion to Basketbol Süper Ligi.
