= Westlake High School (Maryland) =

Location
- 3300 Middletown Road; Waldorf, Maryland 20603; United States; 38°37′19″N 76°57′54″W

Information
- Type: Public high school
- Founded: 1992
- School district: Charles County Public Schools
- Principal: Dana Fenwick
- Staff: 73.00 (FTE)
- Grades: 9-12
- Enrollment: 1,210 (2017-18)
- Student to teacher ratio: 16.58
- Language: English
- Campus: Suburban
- Colors: Aqua; Orange; White
- Athletics conference: Southern Maryland Athletic Conference
- Team name: Wolverines
- Website: http://www2.ccboe.com/westlake/

Westlake High School is a public high school located in the west central section of Waldorf, Charles County, Maryland.

Established in 1992, the school is named for the "Westlake" area of Waldorf, consisting of the neighborhoods of Dorchester, Hampshire, and Lancaster.

== Academics ==
Advanced Placement (AP) courses are offered at Westlake. The school has an AP participation rate of 18%.

Extracurriculars, such as Envirothon, It's Academic, Model United Nations, theatre, and band, among others, are offered at Westlake.

== Demographics ==
The school is minority-majority, with 96% of the school being of a racial minority in the United States. As of 2024, the racial makeup of the school is:

- 73.4% Black
- 11% Hispanic
- 6% Two or more races
- 5.2% Asian
- 4% White
- 0.2% American Indian/Alaska Native
- 0.2% Native Hawaiian/Pacific Islander

47% of students are economically disadvantaged.

== Sports ==
The school is a member of the Southern Maryland Athletic Conference.

Westlake High School won the 3A state football championship in 2008.

Westlake won the 2A state championship in basketball in 2022.

In unified track and field, a combined team from North Point High School and Westlake earned a state championship at Special Olympics Maryland 2026.

== Notable alumni ==
- Christina Clemons, Olympic hurdler
- Cordae, rapper
- Tim Hightower, NFL Runningback, Arizona Cardinals, Washington Redskins
- Erick Hunter, NFL linebacker for the New England Patriots
- Marquel Lee, NFL linebacker
- Shawn Lemon, CFL player
- Christina Milian, musician
- Natasha Rothwell, writer, actress, teacher and comedian
- Randy Starks, NFL defensive end
