= Henry E. Lackey High School =

Location
- 3000 Chicamuxen Road; Indian Head, Maryland 20640; United States; 38°34′46″N 77°7′39.5″W

Information
- School type: Public, secondary school
- Founded: 1919 (as Indian Head High School) 1969 (as Henry E. Lackey High School)
- School district: Charles County Public Schools
- Principal: Cheryl Davis
- Staff: 67.00 (FTE)
- Grades: 9–12
- Enrollment: 1,025 (2017-18)
- Student to teacher ratio: 15.30
- Language: English
- Campus: Rural
- Colors: Blue, black and grey
- Athletics conference: Southern Maryland Athletic Conference
- Mascot: Charger
- Website: www.ccboe.com/schools/lackey/

Henry E. Lackey High School is a high school in Charles County, Maryland, United States. It is run by Charles County Public Schools.

== History ==
The current building was completed in 1969, replacing a previous building built in 1953 which was rededicated as General Smallwood Middle School. At the same time, it was combined with the former Pomonkey High School built in 1957. Like Thomas Stone High School, Lackey High School was constructed with some classrooms underground; these are the only two schools in Charles County to feature underground classrooms.

A webpage of the College of Southern Maryland may refer to an earlier Pomonkey High School building than the one mentioned in the Banneker School's webpage. Until 1965 this was a segregated (African-American) school. It was rededicated as Matthew Henson Middle School.

The high school is named for Rear Admiral Henry E. Lackey of the local Naval facility, who was credited with helping to start the school at Indian Head, Maryland, in 1920, one of the first high schools in the county. The school originally bore only his last name, initially the Lackey School, then Lackey High School, but was renamed to his full name in 2001 to make it clearer.

Although the mailing address says Indian Head, only the original Lackey School was located within Indian Head, Maryland. The General Smallwood Middle School is located in Potomac Heights, Maryland, while the current building is closest to the village of Marbury, Maryland.

== Education ==
=== Advanced Placement courses ===
Currently, Lackey offers the following AP Courses:

- English Language and Composition
- English Literature and Composition
- European History
- Human Geography
- Psychology
- United States History
- World History
- Calculus AB
- Statistics
- Biology
- Chemistry
- Environmental Science
- Physics 1
- Spanish Language
- Art History
- Computer Science Principles
- Precalculus
- African American Studies

== Sports ==
Currently, the Lackey Chargers compete in the Southern Maryland Athletic Conference (SMAC) along with the other public schools in Charles, Calvert, and St. Mary's Counties.

Below is a list of varsity athletics offered at Lackey.

- Boys' & Girls' Soccer
- Golf
- Volleyball
- Field Hockey
- Cross Country
- Football
- Girls' Flag Football
- Cheerleading
- Swimming
- Wrestling
- Indoor Track
- Boys' & Girls' Basketball
- Tennis
- Outdoor Track
- Baseball
- Softball
- Boys' & Girls' Lacrosse

=== Football ===
The Chargers have won 3 regional titles and 2 conference titles over the past 5 years.

=== Soccer ===
Lackey's Men Soccer program have won 4 regional titles (1974, 1986, 2022 and 2023) and were the first Charles county team to win a conference title (2022). The team has earned the United Soccer Coaches High School National Academic Award in 2023. The program has had a number of players earn All-American, All-State and Washington Post All-Met recognition including A.J. De La Garza, Mikah Seger and Dominic Good. Coach Jon Juracko was named the 2023 United Soccer Coaches/Maryland Coach of the Year.

Lackey's Women Soccer program won their first regional title in 2024.

=== Basketball ===
Lackey's Men's and Women's Basketball programs won 3 conference championships, and 1 regional championship, and had 3 appearances in the regional championship game in 4 years.

In 2026, the men's basketball team earned a state championship victory for the first time since 1959.

=== Wrestling ===
The Wrestling program has also had a storied history, especially during the 20 years under Glenn Jones (who was inducted into the National Wrestling Hall of Fame in November 2007)

=== Swimming ===
Lackey is also one of only three schools in the county to have an indoor pool.

=== Track and field ===
For the past 4 years, Lackey has won 1st place for SMAC (southern Maryland athletic conference), Regionals, and States. They are 4 year champs for each of these.

=== Tennis ===
Lackey's Tennis team won its first team regional championship in 2024.

=== Girls' Flag Football ===
Lackey's first Women's Flag Football team is officially created during the 2025-2026 season.

== Notable alumni ==
- Greg Boyer, jazz trombonist
- Bruce Davis, American football player
- A.J. Delagarza, soccer player
- Christopher Frazier, rugby player
- Morgan Green, American football player
- Rod Milstead, American football player
- Dorian Peña, Filipino-American basketball player
