= Pomonkey High School =

Pomonkey Junior-Senior High School

Location
- 3535 Livingston Road (currently Matthew Henson Middle School); Indian Head, Maryland 20640
- Coordinates: 38°36′49.5″N 77°4′34″W

Information
- School type: Public, All Black secondary school
- Opened: 1958
- Closed: 1969 (as a high school)
- School district: Charles County Public Schools
- Principal: Charles J. Coates
- Grades: 9–12
- Enrollment: No longer open
- Language: English
- Campus: Rural
- Colors: Blue and White
- Mascot: Roaring Tiger

Pomonkey Junior-Senior High School was an all-black high school located in Indian Head, Maryland.

== History ==
The property of the school was donated by the black inhabitants of Pomonkey in 1922, following World War I. At the time, the poor and isolated community only had a one-room school for African Americans. The school opened in 1958, where it became the first all-African American high school in Charles County. From 1966 to 1969, it began to be integrated with the all white schools, Henry E. Lackey High School and La Plata High School. The old Pomonkey High School building was then re-opened as a public middle school in 1970, it was rededicated in 1969 as Matthew Henson Middle School.

In 1996, 30 residents of Pomonkey entered in a legal battle to have the school and its land returned to their ownership, as stated by the deed.

== See also ==
- Matthew Henson Middle School
- McConchie One-Room School
