= The Beddow Schools =

Private schools in Maryland, United States

The Beddow Schools is a private school in Maryland serving elementary school through high school with campuses in Prince George's and Charles counties: a secondary school in the Accokeek census-designated place and primary schools in the Fort Washington and Waldorf CDPs.

As of 2009 the campuses had 25 employees and 200 students combined. In 2008 there were 40 students in the secondary grades.

== History ==
The school system was founded by Trudy Beddow, who was previously a history teacher in a school near Silver Spring that was a part of the Montgomery County Public Schools system. She was dismissed from her position by the principal in 1966; Beddow stated that she disliked the school's conservative atmosphere. After working as an assistant producer on the show It's Academic, she decided to start the school circa 1974, initially holding it in the family room of her house.

It later became the Beddow Montessori School.

== Operations ==
As of 2004 the secondary school relies on administrators to provide counseling to students in regards to their post-high school university, college, or career choices, as the secondary division is, as stated by David Anderson of The Gazette, "tiny".

== Academics ==
As of 2004 all of the students in the secondary division graduate. As of 2009 about 90% of the graduating students attend post-secondary institutions.

== Campuses ==
Campuses in Maryland

The three campuses are: Fort Washington Montessori School in Fort Washington census-designated place, Waldorf Montessori School in Waldorf CDP, and Accokeek College Preparatory School in Accokeek CDP.

The Accokeek campus has 7 acres (2.8 ha) of land. Originally the students did physical education in the school's driveway or at a nearby park. The first gymnasium for the property, with a cost of $1.2 million, was due to break ground around 2008.

Prior to 2010 the U.S. Census Bureau defined the land that the Waldorf Campus occupies as being in the St. Charles CDP.
