= William Kwenkeu =

Cameroonian-American football player (born 1997)

Profile
- Position: Linebacker

Personal information
- Born: January 8, 1997 (age 29); Douala, Cameroon
- Listed height: 6 ft 1 in (1.85 m)
- Listed weight: 235 lb (107 kg)

Career information
- High school: St. Charles (MD)
- College: Temple (2016–2021)
- NFL draft: 2022: undrafted

Career history
- Minnesota Vikings (2022–2023); Baltimore Ravens (2024–2025)*
- * Offseason or practice squad member only

Career NFL statistics
- Total tackles: 2
- Stats at Pro Football Reference

William Kwenkeu (born January 8, 1997) is a Cameroonian-American professional football linebacker. He played college football for the Temple Owls and was signed by the Minnesota Vikings of the National Football League (NFL) after going undrafted in the 2022 NFL draft.

== Early life ==
Kwenkeu was born in Cameroon in 1997, the son of high-ranking army officer Francois Kwenkeu and Martine Etammane, who named him after Bill Clinton. Kwenkeu attended a Catholic boarding school in Douala until 2012, when Etammane, who had moved to the United States two years earlier and worked as a hair stylist and nursing assistant, earned enough money to bring her son over. While attending McDonough High School, Kwenkeu tried out for the football team as a sophomore, and excelled despite initially not knowing the game's rules. He transferred to St. Charles High School in 2014, where he played running back, linebacker, placekicker, punter, and returner. In 2016, Kwenkeu became the first athlete from St. Charles to play in the NCAA when he accepted a football scholarship from Temple University.

== College career ==
Kwenkeu spent six seasons playing linebacker for the Temple Owls due to redshirting one year and the extra year of eligibility the NCAA accorded to student-athletes whose careers were interrupted by the COVID-19 pandemic. He recorded his first two sacks as a college player during the 2017 Gasparilla Bowl, which helped the Owls to a 28–3 victory. Kwenkeu became a regular starter in 2020, and had a breakout season in 2021. He scored his first college touchdown that year on a fumble return against the Akron Zips in a game where he also had two sacks and 2.5 tackles for loss, a performance that resulted in him winning an American Athletic Conference Defensive Player of the Week award. In his final year, Kwenkeu totaled 51 tackles, three sacks, and one fumble each forced and recovered. In his college career in total, he played in 47 games, during which he recorded 183 tackles and seven sacks.

== Professional career ==
Pre-draft measurables
Height	Weight	Arm length	Hand span	40-yard dash	10-yard split	20-yard split	20-yard shuttle	Three-cone drill	Vertical jump	Broad jump	Bench press
6 ft 0 1/8 in (1.83 m)	221 lb (100 kg)	31 3/4 in (0.81 m)	9 1/2 in (0.24 m)	4.59 s	1.49 s	2.67 s	4.32 s	6.87 s	33.5 in (0.85 m)	9 ft 5 in (2.87 m)	22 reps
All values from Pro Day

=== Minnesota Vikings ===
The Minnesota Vikings signed Kwenkeu on May 16, 2022, after he participated in the team's rookie minicamp. He became the only African-born player on the Minnesota roster, among several other players with African heritage. Kwenkeu was waived by the Vikings at the end of August 2022 as they cut down their roster to 53 players, but was signed to Minnesota's practice squad soon after. He was elevated to the active roster for Minnesota's Thursday Night Football game against the New England Patriots, making him the ninth Cameroonian to play in the NFL. Kwenkeu was also placed on the active roster for the Week 13 game against the New York Jets, and was signed to the active roster on December 14. Kwenkeu played his first snap on defense (rather than special teams) during Minnesota's loss to the Green Bay Packers in Week 17.

On August 13, 2023, he was waived with an injury designation. After clearing waivers, he reverted to the injured reserve list. He was released on March 12, 2024.

=== Baltimore Ravens ===
On October 1, 2024, the Baltimore Ravens signed Kwenkeu to the practice squad. He signed a reserve/future contract with the Ravens on January 21, 2025. Kwenkeu was waived on August 26, as part of final roster cuts. On December 2, he was re-signed to the practice squad.

== Personal life ==
Kwenkeu spoke very little English when he first arrived in the United States at age 14 and has credited football with helping him learn the language. He became an American citizen in 2017.
