= Great Mills High School =

Coordinates: 38°14′49.23″N 76°29′19.33″W

Location
- 21130 Great Mills Road; Great Mills, Maryland 20634; United States

Information
- School type: Public high school
- Established: 1929
- School district: St. Mary's County Public Schools
- Principal: BeeJay Dothard
- Grades: 9–12
- Enrollment: 1,804
- Colors: Green and gold
- Athletics conference: Southern Maryland Athletic Conference
- Mascot: Hornets
- Website: gmhs.smcps.org

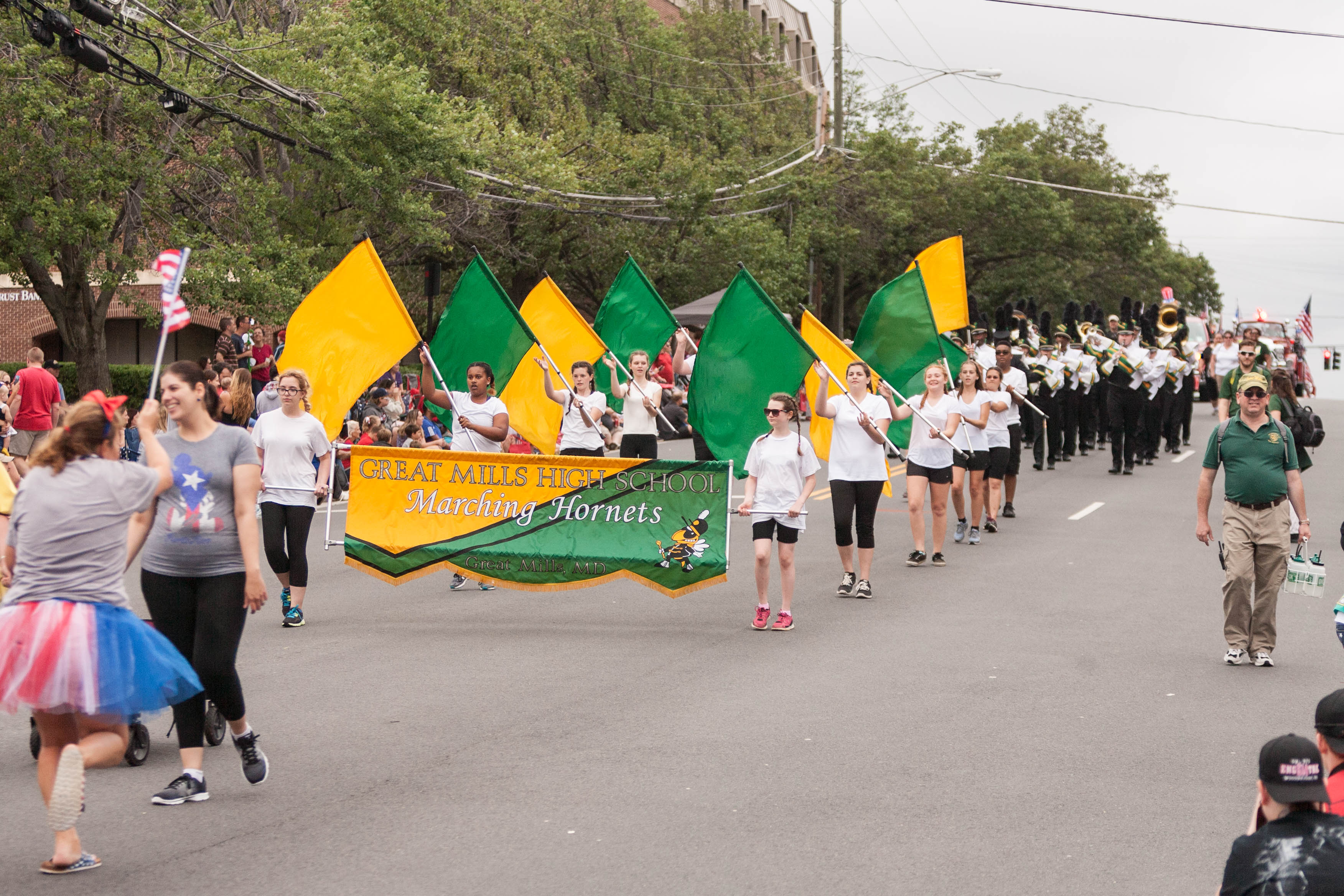
Great Mills High School marching band at a Fourth of July parade in Fairfax, Virginia

Great Mills High School is a public high school in Great Mills, Maryland, United States. It is operated by St. Mary's County Public Schools and serves students in grades 9 through 12. The school identifies itself as the oldest high school in Southern Maryland and traces its opening to 1929. It is one of the traditional comprehensive public high schools in St. Mary's County, along with Chopticon High School and Leonardtown High School.

The school is located in southern St. Mary's County, near Lexington Park and Naval Air Station Patuxent River. The naval air station is the county's largest employer and is home to the Naval Air Systems Command and the Naval Air Warfare Center Aircraft Division.

== History ==
Great Mills High School opened in 1929 and is described by St. Mary's County Public Schools as the oldest high school in Southern Maryland. A county educational facilities plan lists Great Mills High School among the county high schools modernized in the 1990s, with Great Mills listed for 1994.

In 1978, the Community College at St. Mary's County was established at Great Mills High School, expanding community-college service into St. Mary's County. The institution later became part of the College of Southern Maryland, which adopted its current regional name in 2000.

=== Desegregation ===
Great Mills High School was involved in the desegregation of St. Mary's County public schools during the late 1950s. In 1958, William Groves filed suit seeking the admission of his children, Thomas Conrad Groves and Joan Elaine Groves, to Great Mills High School. The federal district court noted that the children would have been assigned to Great Mills High School under the county's rules if they had been white, and that the segregated Jarboesville school did not offer all courses available at Great Mills.

The United States Court of Appeals for the Fourth Circuit upheld an order permitting Joan Elaine Groves to attend Great Mills High School. Thomas Conrad Groves's claim was treated as moot after the county opened grades seven through nine to Black students. Local history sources identify Joan and Conrad Groves as the first African American students to attend Great Mills High School in fall 1958.

The school's desegregation history was later the subject of With All Deliberate Speed: One High School's Story, a documentary by St. Mary's College of Maryland professor Merideth Taylor.

== Academics ==
Great Mills High School offers Advanced Placement courses in subjects including English, mathematics, science, social studies, world languages, art, and computer science. The school also houses the high-school portion of the St. Mary's County Public Schools STEM Academy, which is offered to students across the school system and is located at Great Mills High School and Spring Ridge Middle School.

The STEM Academy curriculum includes science, mathematics, technology, engineering, research classes, a culminating capstone project, and opportunities for internships and research. St. Mary's County Public Schools identifies the school's proximity to Naval Air Station Patuxent River and the local technology corridor as part of the program's location rationale. Advanced Placement courses, including AP Capstone courses AP Seminar and AP Research, are incorporated into the high-school STEM sequence.

Other academic programs and resources listed by the school include fine arts, NJROTC, social studies, world languages, yearbook, and a college and career center.

== Demographics ==
As reported by the school, Great Mills High School has an enrollment of 1,804 students. The student body is reported as 37% White, 35% African American, 13% Hispanic, 3.4% Asian, and 10% two or more races. The school also reports that 37% of students receive free or reduced-price meals and that 11% of students are students with disabilities.

== Student life and athletics ==
Great Mills High School athletic teams are known as the Hornets. The school is listed by the Maryland Public Secondary Schools Athletic Association and competes in the Southern Maryland Athletic Conference. Sports listed by the school's athletic website include football, basketball, baseball, softball, soccer, lacrosse, volleyball, swimming, tennis, golf, indoor and outdoor track and field, cross country, cheerleading, and field hockey.

Student organizations listed by the school include marching band, chorus, Computer Science Honor Society, The Hornet Press, Lighthouse Productions, National Art Honor Society, National Honor Society, Spanish Honor Society, Student Government Association, Stingers Buddies, and Tri-M.

== 2018 shooting ==
On March 20, 2018, a shooting occurred at Great Mills High School before the start of classes. Seventeen-year-old student Austin Wyatt Rollins shot 16-year-old Jaelynn Willey and 14-year-old Desmond Barnes in a hallway. Willey later died, while Barnes survived.

Rollins was confronted by school resource officer Deputy Blaine Gaskill. Investigators later said Rollins died from a self-inflicted gunshot wound at about the same time Gaskill fired a shot that struck Rollins in the hand. Authorities said Rollins had targeted Willey after the two had recently ended a relationship.

== Notable alumni ==
- Clifford Dukes – former professional football defensive lineman.
- Roy Dyson (class of 1966) – former U.S. Representative and Maryland state senator.
- Tanya Hughes (class of 1990) – high jumper, member of the 1992 United States Olympic team, and four-time NCAA champion at the University of Arizona.
- Toby Morse (class of 1988) – vocalist of H_{2}O.
- John F. Slade III – former Maryland delegate and District Court judge.
- Tubby Smith (class of 1969) – college basketball coach.
