= Ellie Stokes =

Kittitian footballer (born 2003)

Personal information
- Full name: Ellie Lucinda Stokes
- Date of birth: 21 November 2003 (age 22)
- Place of birth: Alexandria, Virginia, United States
- Positions: Forward; midfielder

Team information
- Current team: Colgate Raiders
- Number: 14

Youth career
- North Point Eagles
- 2017–2019: Washington Spirit Academy
- 2019: Baltimore Armour
- 2021: St. Mary's Power

College career
Years	Team	Apps	(Gls)
2022–	Colgate Raiders	35	(3)

International career^{‡}
2018	Saint Kitts and Nevis U15		(6)
2019	Saint Kitts and Nevis U17	3	(7)
2019–	Saint Kitts and Nevis		(1)
- ‡ National team caps and goals as of 21 August 2019

Ellie Lucinda Stokes (born 21 November 2003) is an American-born Saint Kitts and Nevis footballer who plays as a forward for the Colgate Raiders and the Saint Kitts and Nevis women's national team.

== Early life ==
Stokes was born in Alexandria, Virginia and raised in Waldorf, Maryland. She has attended the North Point High School in her hometown.

== International career ==
Stokes represented Saint Kitts and Nevis at the 2018 CONCACAF Girls' Under-15 Championship and the 2020 CONCACAF Women's U-17 Championship qualifying stage.

=== International goals ===
Scores and results list Saint Kitts and Nevis' goal tally first.

No.	Date	Venue	Opponent	Score	Result	Competition
1	6 October 2019	Ato Boldon Stadium, Couva, Trinidad and Tobago	Trinidad and Tobago	1–0	4–1	2020 CONCACAF Women's Olympic Qualifying Championship qualification
