= Donta Jones =

American football player (born 1972)

No. 53, 54
- Position: Linebacker

Personal information
- Born: August 27, 1972 (age 54); Washington, D.C., U.S.
- Listed height: 6 ft 2 in (1.88 m)
- Listed weight: 235 lb (107 kg)

Career information
- High school: McDonough (Pomfret, Maryland)
- College: Nebraska
- NFL draft: 1995: 4th round, 125th overall pick

Career history
- Pittsburgh Steelers (1995–1998); Carolina Panthers (1999); New Orleans Saints (2000); Chicago Bears (2001)*
- * Offseason or practice squad member only

Awards and highlights
- National champion (1994); First-team All-Big Eight (1994)

Career NFL statistics
- Total tackles: 88
- Sacks: 4
- FF / FR: 1 / 1
- Stats at Pro Football Reference

Markeysia Donta Jones (born August 27, 1972) is an American former professional football player who was a linebacker in the National Football League (NFL). He played college football for the Nebraska Cornhuskers. He was selected by the Pittsburgh Steelers in the fourth round of the 1995 NFL draft. He played for six seasons in the National Football League (NFL) for the Steelers, Carolina Panthers and New Orleans Saints and Chicago Bears.

== Early life ==
Jones attended Maurice J. McDonough High School in Pomfret, Maryland. While there he was an All-State and All-Metro Washington D.C. selection as a two-way starter on the football team. He played both linebacker and tight end. As a senior, he recorded seven receptions on offense. On defense, he recorded 172 total tackles, and 15 sacks. He was chosen to play in the Big 33 Football Classic in 1990.

He was also the starting center for his high school basketball team. He averaged 10 points-per-game. He also ran track & field, recording a personal best of 1:58 in the 800 meters run and 49 seconds in the 400 meters.

== College career ==
Jones earned a scholarship and attended the University of Nebraska–Lincoln, where as a freshman in 1990, he redshirt. In 1991, as a redshirt freshman, he appeared in six games. He recorded eight tackles and one sack (that being Gino Torretta). As a redshirt sophomore in 1992, he served as a back-up at both outside linebacker positions, to starters Travis Hill and Trev Alberts and occasionally David White. Jones appeared in all 12 games, recording 21 tackles (seven solo.), four tackles-for-loss, two sacks and six quarterback hurries. In 1993, as a redshirt junior, he appeared in nine games (eight starts), missing three with a sprained ankle. He recorded 25 tackles, one sack, one forced fumble, two fumble recoveries, one pass broken up and 10 quarterback hurries. As a redshirt senior in 1994, he started all 12 games. He recorded 52 tackles (23 solo.), 10 tackles-for-loss, five sacks, one forced fumble, two passes broken up and 22 quarterback hurries. For the season, he earned All-Big Eight. He graduated with a degree in accounting and business administration.

In 2007, Jones was inducted into the Nebraska Football Hall of Fame.

== Professional career ==
Jones was selected in the fourth round (125th overall) in the 1995 NFL draft by the Pittsburgh Steelers. As a rookie in 1995, he appeared in all 16 games and recorded three tackles for the eventual AFC champions. In 1996, he appeared in 15 games with two starts. He recorded 13 tackles (nine solo.) and one sack and one forced fumble. For the 1997 season, he appeared in all 16 games with four starts. He recorded 15 tackles (six solo.), one pass broken up, one fumble recovery. Prior to the 1998 season, on June 9, he re-signed with the Steelers. For the season, he appeared in all 16 games with three starts. He recorded 17 tackles (11 solo.) and three sacks.

On February 12, 1999, Jones signed as an unrestricted free agent with the Carolina Panthers. While with the Panthers, he competed with former Steelers linebacker Kevin Greene. For his lone season with the Panthers, Jones appeared in all 16 games. He recorded 21 tackles (18 solo.) and one fumble recovery and three passes broken up. He was cut by the Panthers on August 20, 2000, at the end of the preseason.

On August 22, 2000, two days after cut by the Panthers, Jones signed a one-year contract with the New Orleans Saints. For the season, he appeared in 12 games and recorded eight tackles.

On August 8, 2001, he was signed by the Chicago Bears, however, he was released 19 days later.
