= St. Catharine (Waldorf, Maryland) =

Historic house in Maryland, United States

- U.S. National Register of Historic Places
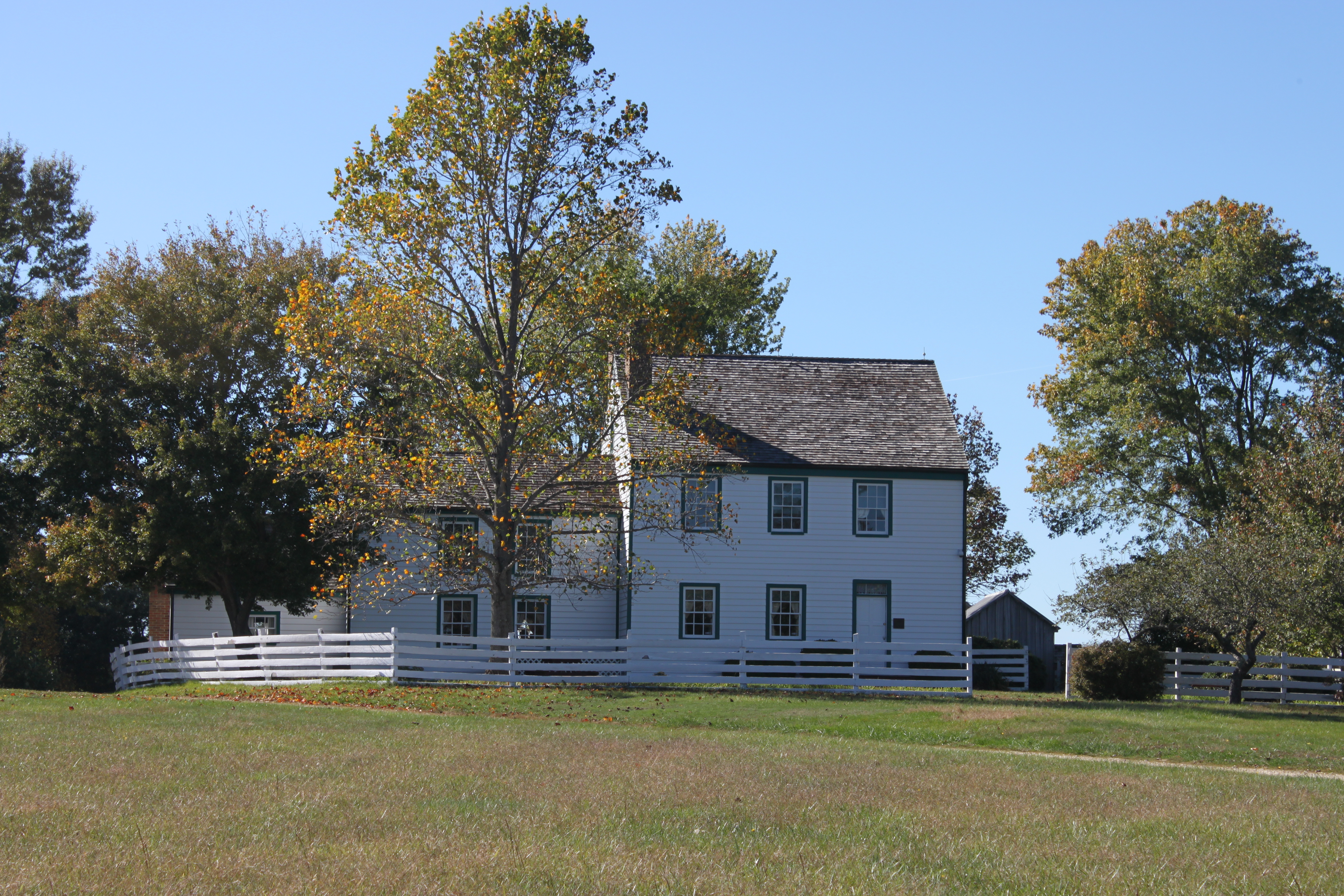
- St. Catharine, October 2014

- Location within Maryland Location within the United States
- Location: 3725 Dr. Samuel Mudd Road, Waldorf, Maryland
- Coordinates: 38°36′34″N 76°49′36″W
- Area: 10 acres (4.0 ha)
- Built: 1865
- NRHP reference No.: 74000950
- Added to NRHP: October 1, 1974

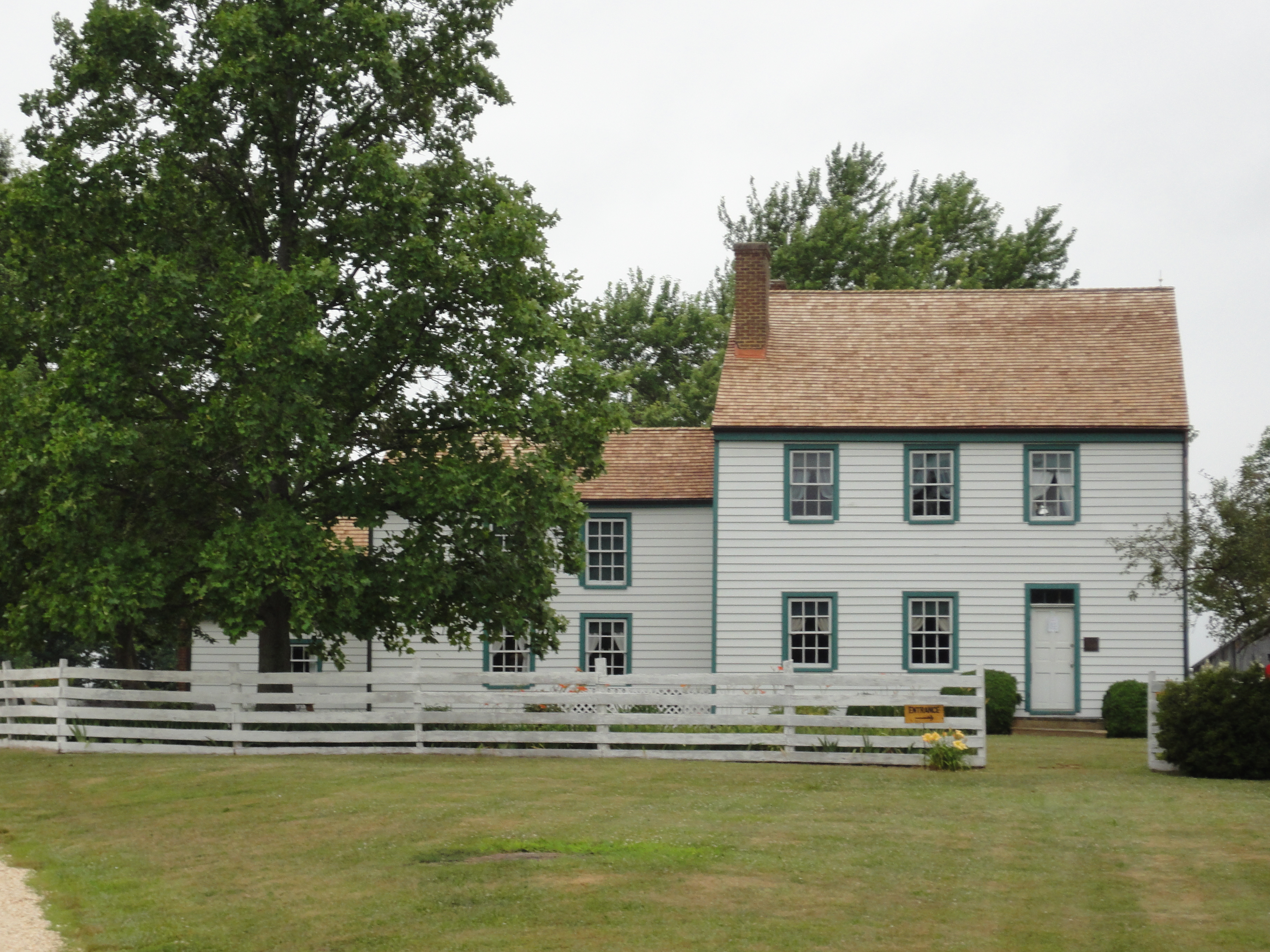

St. Catharine, also known as Dr. Samuel A. Mudd House, is a historic house near Waldorf, Maryland. It is a two-part frame farmhouse with a two-story, three-bay side-passage main house with a smaller two-story, two-bay wing. It features a one-story hip-roofed porch across the facade added in 1928. It was at this house where Samuel A. Mudd treated the injured John Wilkes Booth, who was fleeing justice a day after assassinating President Abraham Lincoln on April 14, 1865, following the defeat of the Confederacy in the American Civil War.

"St. Catharine" has been in the Mudd family since the 1690s. In 1974, St. Catharine was listed on the National Register of Historic Places. Currently, it is operated as a historic house museum.
