= Bruce Davis (offensive tackle) =

American football player (1956–2021)

No. 79, 77
- Position: Offensive tackle

Personal information
- Born: June 21, 1956; Rutherfordton, North Carolina, U.S.
- Died: December 25, 2021 (aged 65); Houston, Texas, U.S.
- Listed height: 6 ft 6 in (1.98 m)
- Listed weight: 287 lb (130 kg)

Career information
- High school: Lackey (Indian Head, Maryland)
- College: UCLA
- NFL draft: 1979: 11th round, 294th overall pick

Career history
- Oakland/Los Angeles Raiders (1979–1987); Houston Oilers (1987–1989); Los Angeles Raiders (1990)*
- * Offseason or practice squad member only

Awards and highlights
- 2× Super Bowl champion (XV, XVIII)

Career NFL statistics
- Games played: 160
- Games started: 115
- Fumble recoveries: 2
- Stats at Pro Football Reference

Bruce Edward Davis (June 21, 1956 – December 25, 2021) was an American professional football player who was an offensive tackle in the National Football League (NFL) for 11 seasons with the Oakland/Los Angeles Raiders and the Houston Oilers. He played college football for the UCLA Bruins, switching to the offensive line after beginning his collegiate career as a defensive tackle. He won two Super Bowls with the Raiders.

== Career ==
Davis attended the University of California, Los Angeles, and began his collegiate career with the Bruins as a defensive tackle. He moved to offensive tackle as a senior after the offensive line was beset with injuries.

Davis was selected by the Oakland Raiders in the 11th round of the 1979 NFL draft, his low position due to his limited time as an offensive lineman. Raiders' owner Al Davis admired his lower-body strength. Mentored out of college by the Raiders' Art Shell, Bruce Davis became a full-time starter at left tackle by 1982, when he supplanted Shell. Davis won two Super Bowls with the Raiders (XV in 1981, XVIII in 1984), and teammates voted him the team's best offensive lineman in 1985.

In 1987, Davis was traded mid-season to the Houston Oilers, who were 5–2 and contending for the playoffs. He played in 43 consecutive games for the Oilers until he was released after the 1989 season. He had been holding out, seeking a new contract after making $435,000 in the past season. He had arthroscopic surgery on both knees that offseason and fell to third on the depth chart at left tackle behind Don Maggs and David Williams. Davis re-signed with the Raiders prior to the 1990 exhibition season, but he was released before the regular-season opener. He ended his 11-year career with 160 games played and 115 starts.

== Personal life ==
Davis was born on June 21, 1956, in Rutherfordton, North Carolina, and graduated from Henry E. Lackey High School in Indian Head, Maryland. After his playing career, he became a high school history and geography teacher.

Davis's son Bruce II also attended UCLA and was an All-American at defensive end with the Bruins, and played professionally as well for the Oakland Raiders. They are one of the few father–son combos to have played on teams that reached the Super Bowl; Bruce II was a linebacker for the Pittsburgh Steelers squad that advanced to Super Bowl XLIII.

Davis died on December 25, 2021, in Houston, Texas, at the age of 65.
