= North Point High School =

Location
- 2500 Davis Road; Waldorf, Maryland 20603; United States; 38°38′31″N 76°58′35″W

Information
- School type: Public, secondary school
- Motto: The real world starts here... Create your own tomorrow!
- Founded: 2005
- School district: Charles County Public Schools
- Principal: Daniel Kaple
- Teaching staff: 123.20 (FTE)
- Grades: 9–12
- Enrollment: 1960 (2024-25)
- Student to teacher ratio: 14.16
- Language: English
- Campus: Suburban
- Colors: Red, black, gold, and white
- Mascot: Eagle
- Newspaper: Eagle Eye
- Website: www.ccboe.com/schools/northpoint/

North Point High School is a school for career and technology education (formerly science, technology, and industry). It is located in the far western area of Waldorf, Maryland, United States. At 311,000 square feet (28,900 m^{2}) and with about 2,000 students enrolled, it is the largest high school in Charles County. It is also the second newest high school, having opened in 2005. Its mascot, the Eagle, was derived from the motto of Charles County, "The wild side of the Potomac... Where eagles soar!"

Unlike most other high schools, which have all seven/eight class periods per day, North Point (along with St. Charles High School in nearby St. Charles, Maryland) operates on a unique four-block A/B day schedule (1A, 2A, 3A, 4A on A days and 1B, 2B, 3B and 4B on B days), A days and B days occur every other day of the week, which allow for longer 1 hour and 20 minute class periods, rather than the standard 50 minute period in other schools.

At the start of the week, it would either be an A day or B day, depending on what day the previous Friday was (example: If Friday was a B day, Monday would be an A day). Classes begin at 8:05 a.m. and end at 2:50 p.m. every day.

== Technology ==
North Point has 16 Career and Technical Education programs (CTE, formerly referred to as STI for science, technology and industry). An estimated half of the student body is enrolled in one of these programs, while the other half receives a normal high school education.

The programs are as follows:

School of Advanced Technology and Engineering

- Biotechnology
- Cisco Networking Academy
- Engineering
- Cisco Cyber Security

School of Technology

- Automotive Technology
- Collision Repair
- Graphic Communications
- Welding

School of Construction Development

- Drafting & Design
- Construction Design Management
- Electrical Construction

School of Health and Protective Services

- Cosmetology
- Criminal Justice
- Culinary Arts
- Child Development Professions
- Academy of Health Professions

== Honors and awards ==
North Point's SkillsUSA chapter won medals at the SkillsUSA National Leadership Conference in June 2010. The group placed first (gold) in Industrial Motor control, and second (silver) in Culinary Arts. In its first year ever competing in quiz bowl, that team also brought home a gold medal.

One of North Point's CyberPatriot teams attained 8th place within the Open Gold Division in February 2025.

== Athletics ==
- North Point High School has 44 total sports ranging from the Freshman to the Varsity Levels, which compete in the Southern Maryland Athletic Conference (SMAC). North Point competes in the class 3A division.
- Until 2011, The athletic director for North Point was Aly Khan "A.K." Johnson, brother of Penn State Defensive Line Football coach Larry Johnson, and uncle of Larry Johnson Jr.

State Championships

- The 2008 North Point CoEd Varsity Golf won the Maryland 2A State Title on 23 October.
- The North Point Boys Varsity Track teams have collected two state championships. In 2008, they won the Maryland 2A Outdoor Track and Field State Championship (in a tie with Walkersville High School on 24 May. The following winter, they won the 2008/2009 Maryland 2A Indoor Track and Field State Championship on 16 February.
- In 2009, the Girls Varsity Outdoor Track and Field team won the Maryland 2A Outdoor Track and Field State Championship on 23 May.
- The 2010-2011 North Point's Boys Varsity Basketball Team Completed an undefeated 27–0 season with a win against Patterson Senior High in the Maryland 4A Boys Basketball State Championship game on 12 March. North Point is the first team from the SMAC to win a state championship in Boys Basketball since 1999
- In 2023, the Varsity Football team completed a season and won the SMAC State Championship for the 3A/4A Division.

== Notable alumni ==
- Brothers Timmy Hill and Tyler Hill, NASCAR drivers
- Asante Blackk, actor
- Sujita Basnet, Miss Universe Nepal 2021
- Caelen Carson, NFL cornerback for the Dallas Cowboys
- Chelen Garnes, professional football defensive back
- Robyn Parks, basketball player
- Gerel Simmons, basketball player
- Ellie Stokes, soccer player
- Rasheed Walker, NFL offensive tackle for the Green Bay Packers
- Marquis Wright, basketball player

== List of Principals ==
Daniel Kaple (since July 2017)

Michael Simms (July 2013 – June 2017)

Dr. Kimberly Hill (July 2007– June 2013) (later served as Superintendent of Schools from July 2013 - June 2021)

Peter Cevenini (July 2005 – June 2007)
