= Pomonkey, Maryland =

Unincorporated community in Maryland, United States

- Unincorporated community
- Location within the state of Maryland Pomonkey (the United States)
- Coordinates: 38°36′28″N 77°04′18″W
- Country: United States
- State: Maryland
- County: Charles
- Time zone: UTC-5 (Eastern (EST))
  - Summer (DST): UTC-4 (EDT)
- GNIS feature ID: 586633

Pomonkey is an unincorporated community located in Charles County, Maryland, United States at the crossing of Livingston and Pomfret Roads, one mile (1.6 km) from Bryans Road.

== History ==
Pomonkey is named for the Pamunkey tribe of Native Americans that lived in the area. The Brent family owned much of the land from before the American Revolutionary War, asserting their claims after Giles Brent married princess Mary Kittamaquund in the 17th century. Robert Brent (1764-1819) became the first mayor of Washington, D.C. (and freed his slaves in his will).

In the early 19th century, the village of Bumpy Oak was renamed Pomonkey when it was designated a postal stop. Another Robert Brent (1759-1810) and Dorothy Leigh Brent built a plantation house in this area, which they called Brentfield (which later burned down). Their children included Maryland judge George Brent (1817-1881) and Louisiana's U.S. Representative William Leigh Brent (1784-1848), one of whose sons became Maryland Attorney General Robert James Brent and another Confederate General Joseph Lancaster Brent.

The former Pomonkey High School was one of two black segregated high schools in Charles County until the 1960s, and has a proud alumni association. From 1946 to 1970 the "Pomonkey Spoon Factory" manufactured wooden tools and small items. In 2022, the Pomonkey High School Alumni Association held a Centennial Celebration which celebrated its 100 years of history including the fact that it was the first high school in the county created for black students.

For several years, Maryland Airport has planned a 1,300 ft (400 m) expansion, including an energetics (explosives) technical center and business park employing over 3,000 people. However, environmental concerns related to stormwater discharge into Mattawoman Creek delayed those plans. The Naval Research Laboratory has its Free Space Antenna Range on Bumpy Oak Road.

== Demographics ==
Pomonkey itself is an unincorporated area and not part of a Census Designated Place, so few statistics for Pomonkey are available. Bryans Road, Maryland is the nearest community to Pomonkey for which data are available. However, the area lies at the meeting of ZIP codes 20616 (Bryans Road), 20640 (Indian Head) and 20646 (La Plata). As of 2000, Election District 7 (named for Pomonkey, but which includes Bryans Road and Indian Head) had a population of 11,859 persons. The racial breakdown was 59.0% white, 35.8% black, 1.5% American Indian and Alaskan Native, 1.2% Asian, 0.1% Asian Indian, 0.2% Chinese, 0.6% Filipino, <0.1% Japanese, 0.1% Korean, <0.1% Vietnamese, 0.1% Other Asian, 0.1% Native Hawaiian and other Pacific Islander, 0.5% Other race, 1.8% two or more races.

== Local landmarks ==
- J.C. Parks Elementary School
- Maryland Airport
- Matthew Henson Middle School
- Saint Johns Cemetery
- Saint Johns Chapel
