= Maryland Airport =

Coordinates: 38°36′02″N 077°04′23″W

- IATA: none; ICAO: none; FAA LID: 2W5

Summary
- Airport type: Public
- Owner: PSM Holdings, LLC.
- Operator: PSM Holdings, LLC.
- Serves: Indian Head, Maryland
- Elevation AMSL: 175 ft / 53 m

Map
- Location of airport in Maryland / United States 2W5 (the United States)

Runways
Direction	Length		Surface
Direction	ft	m	Surface
2/20	3,740	1,140	Asphalt

Statistics (2023)
- Aircraft operations (year ending 9/13/2023): 22,050
- Source: Federal Aviation Administration

Maryland Airport (FAA LID: 2W5) is a privately owned, public use airport located four miles (6 km) east of the central business district of Indian Head, in Charles County, Maryland, United States.

== Facilities and aircraft ==
Maryland Airport covers an area of 314 acres (127 ha) which contains one operational runway: 2/20 with a 3,740 x 75 ft asphalt surface.

For the 12-month period ending September 13, 2023, the airport had 22,050 aircraft operations, an average of 60 per day: 98% general aviation, 2% military and <1% air taxi.

Phase 3 of the airport's expansion will include extending the runway to 4,300 feet, along with construction of a parallel taxiway, a ramp to accommodate 75 planes, an access road to Bumpy Oak Road, and a new terminal.

== See also ==
- List of airports in Maryland
