= Southern Maryland Athletic Conference =

High school athletic conference in Maryland, USA

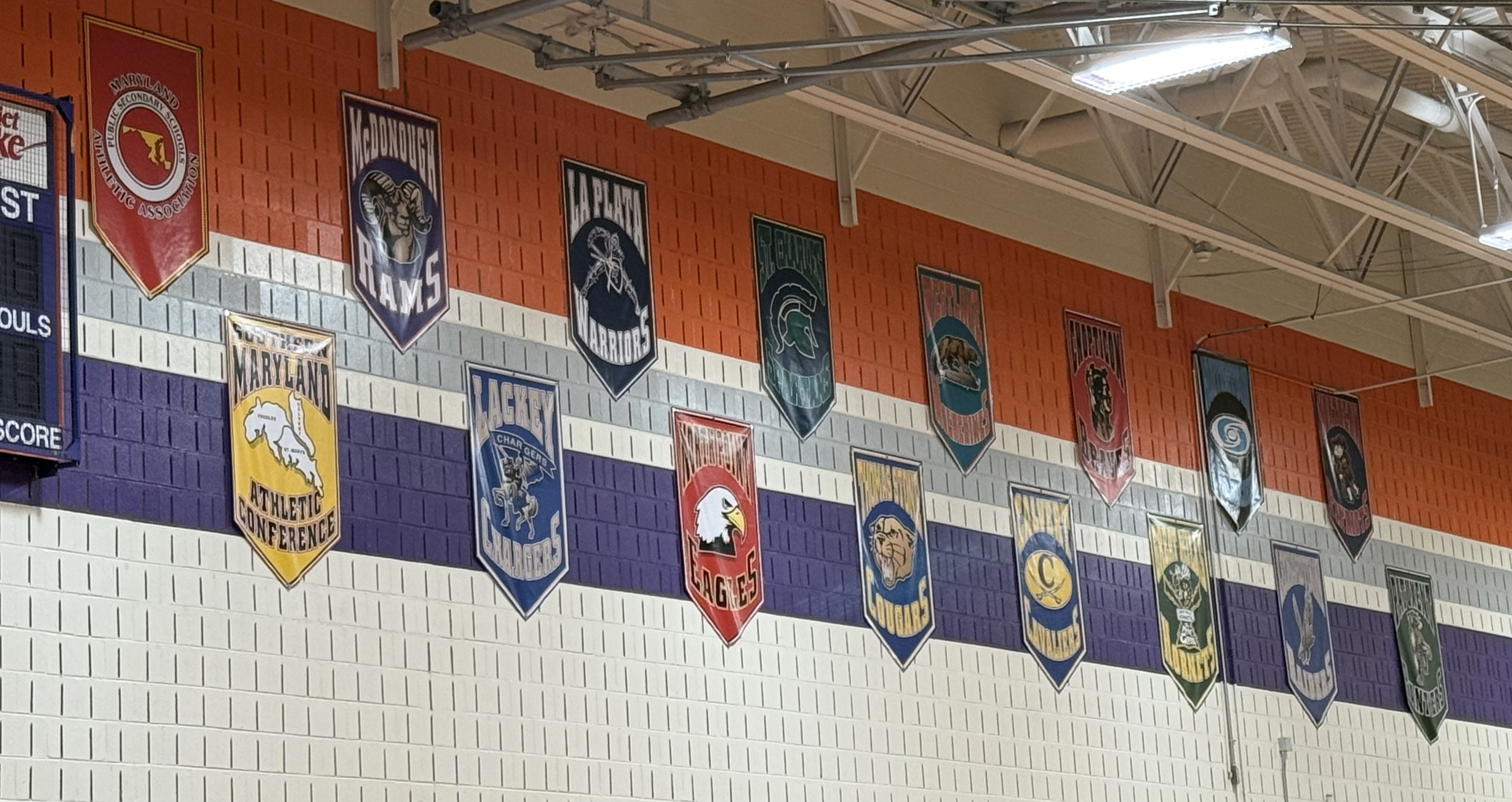
- Abbreviation: SMAC
- Region served: Southern Maryland
- Members: 14 schools
- Website: www.smacathletics.org

The Southern Maryland Athletic Conference (SMAC) is a high school athletic league in Maryland, comprising the public secondary and high schools throughout Southern Maryland.

== Member schools ==
The SMAC's membership consists of the following schools located in Calvert, Charles, and St. Mary's Counties:

- Calvert High School
- Chopticon High School
- Great Mills High School
- Henry E. Lackey High School
- Huntingtown High School
- La Plata High School
- Leonardtown High School
- Maurice J. McDonough High School
- Northern High School
- North Point High School
- Patuxent High School
- St. Charles High School
- Thomas Stone High School
- Westlake High School

St. Mary's Ryken High School was a member, and the only private Maryland school in a public league, but withdrew to join the Washington Catholic Athletic Conference (WCAC) in 2002. St. Charles High School became a member of SMAC in 2014.

== See also ==
- Maryland Crab Bowl
- Maryland Public Secondary Schools Athletic Association
- Sports in Maryland
