= St. Charles, Maryland =

- Former CDP
- Location of Saint Charles, Maryland
- Coordinates: 38°36′20″N 76°54′57″W
- Country: United States
- State: Maryland
- County: Charles

Area
  - Total: 11.9 sq mi (30.8 km^{2})
  - Land: 11.8 sq mi (30.6 km^{2})
  - Water: 0.12 sq mi (0.3 km^{2})
- Elevation: 200 ft (61 m)

Population (2000)
  - Total: 33,379
  - Density: 2,829/sq mi (1,092.4/km^{2})
- Time zone: UTC−5 (Eastern (EST))
  - Summer (DST): UTC−4 (EDT)
- FIPS code: 24-69350
- GNIS feature ID: 0591211

St. Charles is a planned community in Charles County, Maryland, United States. It is 22 miles (35 km) south-southeast of Washington, D.C., 24 miles (39 km) from northern Virginia and immediately south of Waldorf, which is the mailing address. (St. Charles comprises nearly all the population of Waldorf's zip code 20602, and much of 20603). At the 2000 census, it was delineated as a census-designated place (CDP), with a population of 33,379. It was included in the Waldorf CDP for the 2010 census.

== History ==
Planning for St. Charles was started in 1965 by St. Charles City, Inc. That developer sold the undeveloped land in 1968 to Interstate General Co. (now known as American Community Properties Trust). According to the developer, it is halfway through completion as outlined in its master plan.

When completed, St. Charles will comprise five villages — Smallwood and Westlake, which have been completed; Fairway, which is under development; and Piney Reach and Wooded Glen, which remain undeveloped. Each village has three to four neighborhoods. Residents in St. Charles have access to a variety of community amenities, including walking paths, swimming pools, scenic lakes, playgrounds and neighborhood centers. Many residents commute out of the county to work, including military residents who are stationed at Andrews Air Force Base, Bolling AFB, Patuxent River NAS, or the Pentagon. Many civilian residents are federal employees. St. Charles Towne Center is a 1.2-million-square-foot (110,000 m^{2}) 2-level regional shopping mall serving residents of a large four-county area. It opened in 1988 and was remodeled in 2007.

Many sections of St. Charles are still in development, including a retirement community for persons 60 years and older, and several themed restaurants west of U.S. Route 301. Hampshire, Lancaster, Dorchester, Sheffield, Heritage, Bannister, Wakefield, Huntington and Carrington are the already existing neighborhoods of St. Charles. In 2008, St. Charles Parkway was connected with Rosewick Road, providing a new alternative route to the county seat La Plata.

== Geography ==
According to the United States Census Bureau, the CDP had a total area of 11.9 square miles (31 km^{2}), of which 11.8 square miles (31 km^{2}) is land and 0.1 square miles (0.26 km^{2}) (1.09%) is water.

== Nearby communities ==
Waldorf (north), Bennsville (west), La Plata (south, but not adjacent)

== Demographics ==
As of the census of 2000, there were 33,379 people, 11,567 households, and 8,628 families residing in the CDP. The population density was 2,829.3 inhabitants per square mile (1,092.4/km^{2}). There were 12,064 housing units at an average density of 1,022.6 per square mile (394.8/km^{2}). The racial makeup of the CDP is in flux. As of the 2000 census, the racial makeup was 64.27% White, 28.67% African American, 0.70% Native American, 2.41% Asian, 0.07% Pacific Islander, 1.05% from other races, and 2.82% from two or more races. Hispanic or Latino of any race were 3.34% of the population.

There were 11,567 households, out of which 46.7% had children under the age of 18 living with them, 50.2% were married couples living together, 19.3% had a female householder with no husband present, and 25.4% were non-families. 19.4% of all households were made up of individuals, and 5.3% had someone living alone who was 65 years of age or older. The average household size was 2.86 and the average family size was 3.25.

In the CDP, the population was spread out, with 31.7% under the age of 18, 8.7% from 18 to 24, 36.1% from 25 to 44, 18.1% from 45 to 64, and 5.4% who were 65 years of age or older. The median age was 31 years. For every 100 females, there were 90.4 males. For every 100 females age 18 and over, there were 84.8 males.

The median income for a household in the CDP was $56,992, and the median income for a family was $60,434. Males had a median income of $41,210 versus $32,024 for females. The per capita income for the CDP was $21,669. About 4.4% of families and 6.5% of the population were below the poverty line, including 6.8% of those under age 18 and 15.6% of those age 65 or over.

== Education ==
The Beddow School's Waldorf Montessori School is in the area that once made up St. Charles CDP.

St. Charles High School, known as the home of the Spartans, is located in St. Charles Maryland at 5305 Piney Church Road, Waldorf, MD 20602. The school opened in August 2014 and features a 6 lane swimming pool, a 'Science Sphere' and digital classrooms.
