= Waldorf, Maryland =

- Census-designated place
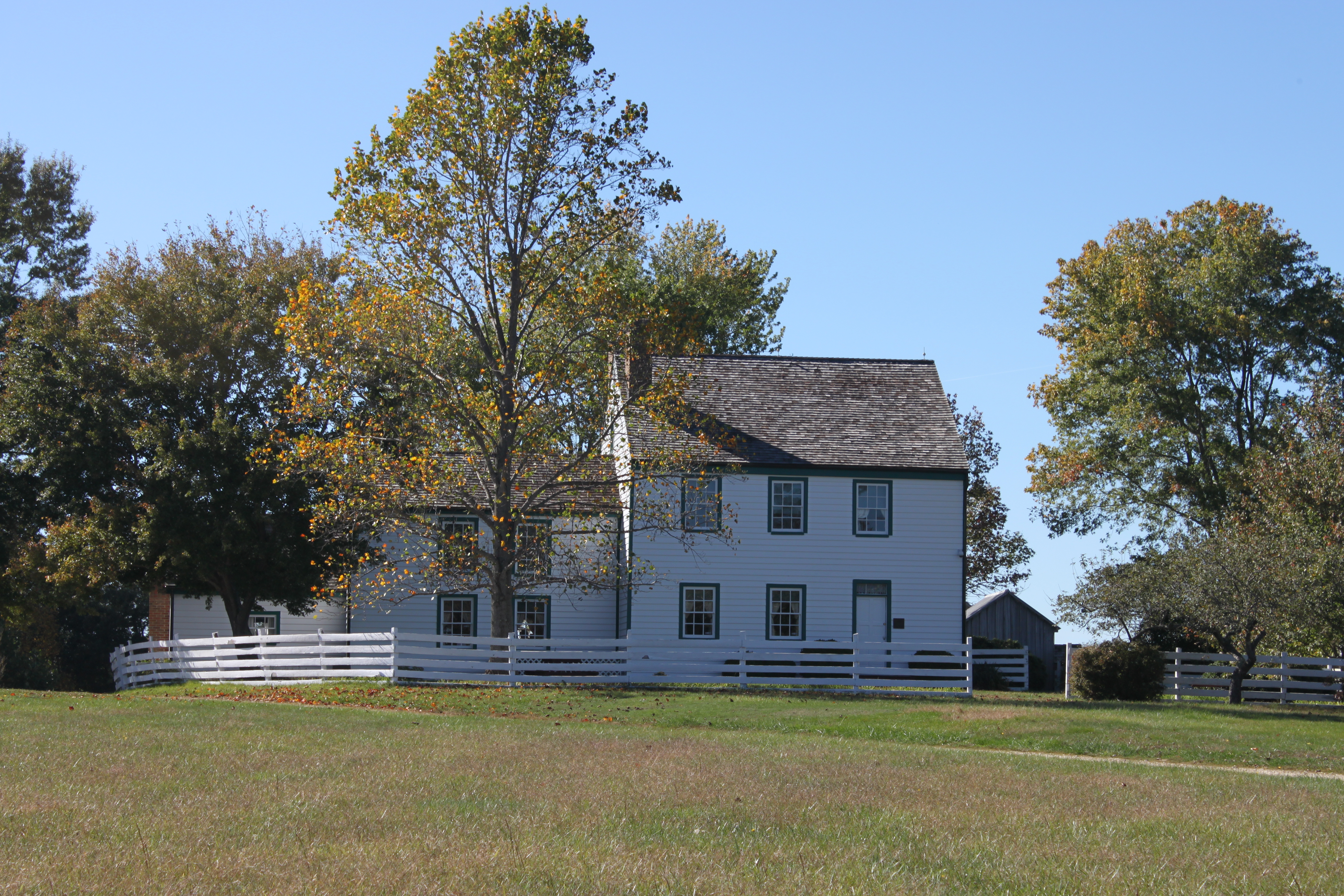
- Dr. Samuel A. Mudd House Museum

- Location of Waldorf, Maryland

- Location within Maryland Location within the United States
- Coordinates: 38°38′46″N 76°53′54″W
- Country: United States
- State: Maryland
- County: Charles
- Named for: William Waldorf Astor

Government
  - Type: No city government, Charles County Board of Commissioners
  - President, Board of Commissioners: Reuben B. Collins II

Area
  - Total: 36.47 sq mi (94.46 km^{2})
  - Land: 36.24 sq mi (93.87 km^{2})
  - Water: 0.23 sq mi (0.59 km^{2})
- Elevation: 207 ft (63 m)

Population (2020)
  - Total: 81,410
  - Density: 2,246.2/sq mi (867.26/km^{2})
- Time zone: UTC−5 (Eastern (EST))
  - Summer (DST): UTC−4 (EDT)
- ZIP codes: 20601-20604
- Area codes: 301, 240
- FIPS code: 24-81175
- GNIS feature ID: 0588020

Waldorf is a census-designated place in Charles County, Maryland, United States. Located 23 miles (37 km) south-southeast of Washington, D.C., Waldorf is part of Southern Maryland. Its population was 81,410 at the 2020 census. Waldorf has experienced dramatic growth, increasing its population 16-fold from fewer than 5,000 residents in 1980 to its current population. It is now the largest commercial and residential area in Southern Maryland as well as a major suburb in the Washington metropolitan area.

== History ==
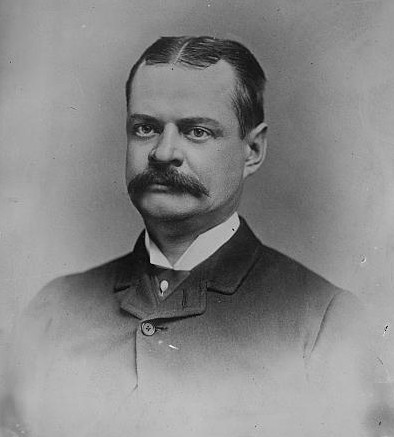
The community is named after William Waldorf Astor, whose great-grandfather hailed from Walldorf, Germany.

What is now the Waldorf area was originally part of the territory of the Piscataway Indian Nation, along with all of Southern Maryland, including Charles County. Close to the current western Waldorf area, the presence of villages, Indian grave sites (holding remains of over 1,000 people) and hunting encampments of Native American / Indian peoples have been confirmed, by archeological study of evidence dating from 1690 back to 6,000 years ago.

Europeans and African Americans first settled in the area in the 1600s. The town of Waldorf's original name was Beantown at least as far back as the American Civil War. During his flight after assassinating Abraham Lincoln, John Wilkes Booth told a road sentry he was headed to his home in Charles County near Beantown and was allowed to proceed. Booth later received medical attention for his broken leg from Dr. Samuel A. Mudd at his home in Waldorf, before continuing his flight. In 1880, the General Assembly of Maryland by an act changed the name to "Waldorf" in honor of William Waldorf Astor (1848–1919), the great-grandson of John Jacob Astor (1763–1848), who was born in Walldorf, Palatinate, Germany. On July 29, 1908, the city of Plumb Valley in Waseca County, Minnesota, changed its name to Waldorf after Waldorf, Maryland.

Once a tobacco market village, Waldorf came to prominence in the 1950s as a gambling destination after slot machines were legalized in Charles County in 1949. The boom lasted until 1968, when gambling was once again outlawed. Its subsequent substantial growth as a residential community began with a 1970 loan package from the Department of Housing and Urban Development which fueled the giant planned community of St. Charles, within Waldorf.

== Geography ==
According to the United States Census Bureau, the CDP has a total area of 36.5 square miles (94.5 km^{2}), of which 36.2 square miles (93.8 km^{2}) is land and 0.27 square miles (0.7 km^{2}), or 0.7%, is water.

The soils of Waldorf are known to contain various amounts of Marlboro Clay, a type that is only found in Southern Maryland. It can be either red or grey in color.

=== Climate ===
The climate in this area is characterized by hot, humid summers and generally mild to cold winters. The area gets yearly snowfall, but only gets major blizzards every few years. According to the Köppen Climate Classification system, Waldorf has a humid subtropical climate, abbreviated "Cfa" on climate maps. The area has a tropical storm / hurricane season (late August through September).
It gets frequent thunderstorms in the summer, some severe, and the area on rare occasion gets serious tornadoes.

== Demographics ==
Historical population
Census	Pop.	Note	%±
1970	647		—
1980	4,952		665.4%
1990	15,058		204.1%
2000	22,312		48.2%
2010	67,752		203.7%
2020	81,410		20.2%
U.S. Decennial Census; 2010 2020

=== Racial and ethnic composition ===
Waldorf CDP, Maryland – Racial and ethnic composition Note: the US Census treats Hispanic/Latino as an ethnic category. This table excludes Latinos from the racial categories and assigns them to a separate category. Hispanics/Latinos may be of any race.
Race / ethnicity (NH = Non-Hispanic)	Pop 2000	Pop 2010	Pop 2020	% 2000	% 2010	% 2020
White alone (NH)	13,268	22,499	14,552	59.47%	33.21%	17.87%
Black or African American alone (NH)	7,076	35,559	51,183	31.71%	52.48%	62.87%
Native American or Alaska Native alone (NH)	110	332	414	0.49%	0.49%	0.51%
Asian alone (NH)	578	2,620	3,320	2.59%	3.87%	4.08%
Native Hawaiian or Pacific Islander alone (NH)	5	48	70	0.02%	0.07%	0.09%
Other race alone (NH)	44	142	564	0.20%	0.21%	0.69%
Mixed race or Multiracial (NH)	581	2,580	4,461	2.60%	3.81%	5.48%
Hispanic or Latino (any race)	650	3,972	6,846	2.91%	5.86%	8.41%
Total	22,312	67,752	81,410	100.00%	100.00%	100.00%

=== 2020 census ===
As of the 2020 census, Waldorf had a population of 81,410. The median age was 36.4 years. 25.3% of residents were under the age of 18 and 10.7% of residents were 65 years of age or older. For every 100 females there were 85.3 males, and for every 100 females age 18 and over there were 79.7 males age 18 and over.

99.1% of residents lived in urban areas, while 0.9% lived in rural areas.

There were 29,280 households in Waldorf, of which 38.1% had children under the age of 18 living in them. Of all households, 42.0% were married-couple households, 15.8% were households with a male householder and no spouse or partner present, and 36.4% were households with a female householder and no spouse or partner present. About 24.8% of all households were made up of individuals and 7.4% had someone living alone who was 65 years of age or older.

There were 30,410 housing units, of which 3.7% were vacant. The homeowner vacancy rate was 1.3% and the rental vacancy rate was 5.4%.

Racial composition as of the 2020 census
Race	Number	Percent
White	15,404	18.9%
Black or African American	51,949	63.8%
American Indian and Alaska Native	563	0.7%
Asian	3,364	4.1%
Native Hawaiian and Other Pacific Islander	77	0.1%
Some other race	3,602	4.4%
Two or more races	6,451	7.9%
Hispanic or Latino (of any race)	6,846	8.4%

=== American Community Survey estimates ===
According to the United States Census Bureau's QuickFacts:

- Foreign born residents – 8%.
- Language other than English spoken at home, 5 years old or older – 9.7%.
- High school graduate or higher, 25 and older – 94.3%.
- Bachelor's degree or higher, 25 and older – 29.5%.
- Veteran population was 7,459 people (2015–2019).
- Residents with a disability, under age 65 – 5.7%.
- Residents without health insurance – 3.3%.
- Median household income – $95,695; per capita income – $40,559; persons in poverty, 5.5% (5.5% of 81,410 people in Waldorf is 4,477).

=== 2000 census ===
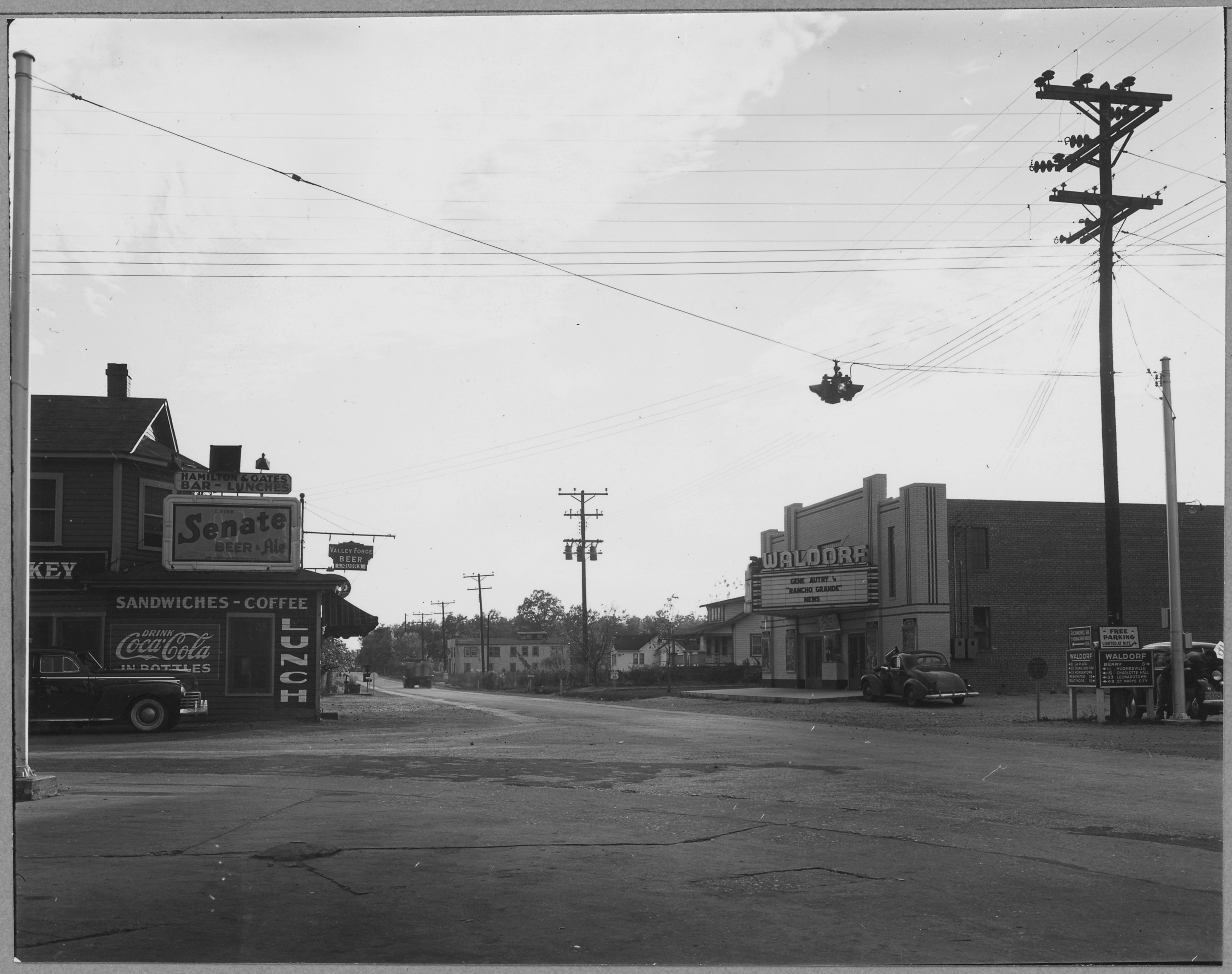
Waldorf, 1941

As of the census of 2000, there were 22,312 people, 7,603 households, and 5,991 families residing in the CDP. In the CDP, the population density was 1,746.0 inhabitants per square mile (674.1/km^{2}). There were 7,827 housing units at an average density of 612.5 per square mile (236.5/km^{2}). The racial makeup of the CDP was 61.11% White, 31.98% African American, 0.54% Native American, 2.59% Asian, 0.02% Pacific Islander, 0.88% from other races, and 2.88% from two or more races. Hispanic or Latino of any race were 2.91% of the population.

There were 7,603 households, out of which 45.5% had children under the age of 18 living with them, 58.6% were married couples living together, 15.5% had a female householder with no husband present, and 21.2% were non-families. 14.8% of all households were made up of individuals, and 2.2% had someone living alone who was 65 years of age or older. The average household size was 2.93 and the average family size was 3.24.

In the CDP the population was spread out, with 30.6% under the age of 18, 7.5% from 18 to 24, 36.4% from 25 to 44, 20.7% from 45 to 64, and 4.8% who were 65 years of age or older. The median age was 33 years. For every 100 females, there were 94.4 males. For every 100 females age 18 and over, there were 90.8 males.

The median income for a household in the CDP was $68,869, and the median income for a family was $71,439 (these figures had risen to $86,901 and $94,432 respectively as of a 2007 estimate). Males had a median income of $45,293 versus $35,386 for females. The per capita income for the CDP was $24,728. About 2.7% of families and 4.4% of the population were below the poverty line, including 6.4% of those under age 18 and 2.2% of those age 65 or over.

== Economy ==
Waldorf is predominantly a bedroom community for many residents who commute to work at other points in the Washington metropolitan area. Commuters work primarily in federal, professional services, and healthcare industries. Waldorf's local jobs are primarily in the service and sales industry, with healthcare and construction industries having a strong presence as well. St. Charles Towne Center, a two-story shopping mall, opened in 1990.

U.S. Route 301, the main highway through the city, boasts the "Waldorf Motor Mile," with car dealerships located primarily along the northbound side. In 2005, Waldorf opened its third public high school (North Point High School), which has advanced science/technology programs; the Capital Clubhouse 24-hour indoor sports complex and ice rink also opened that year.

== Arts and culture ==
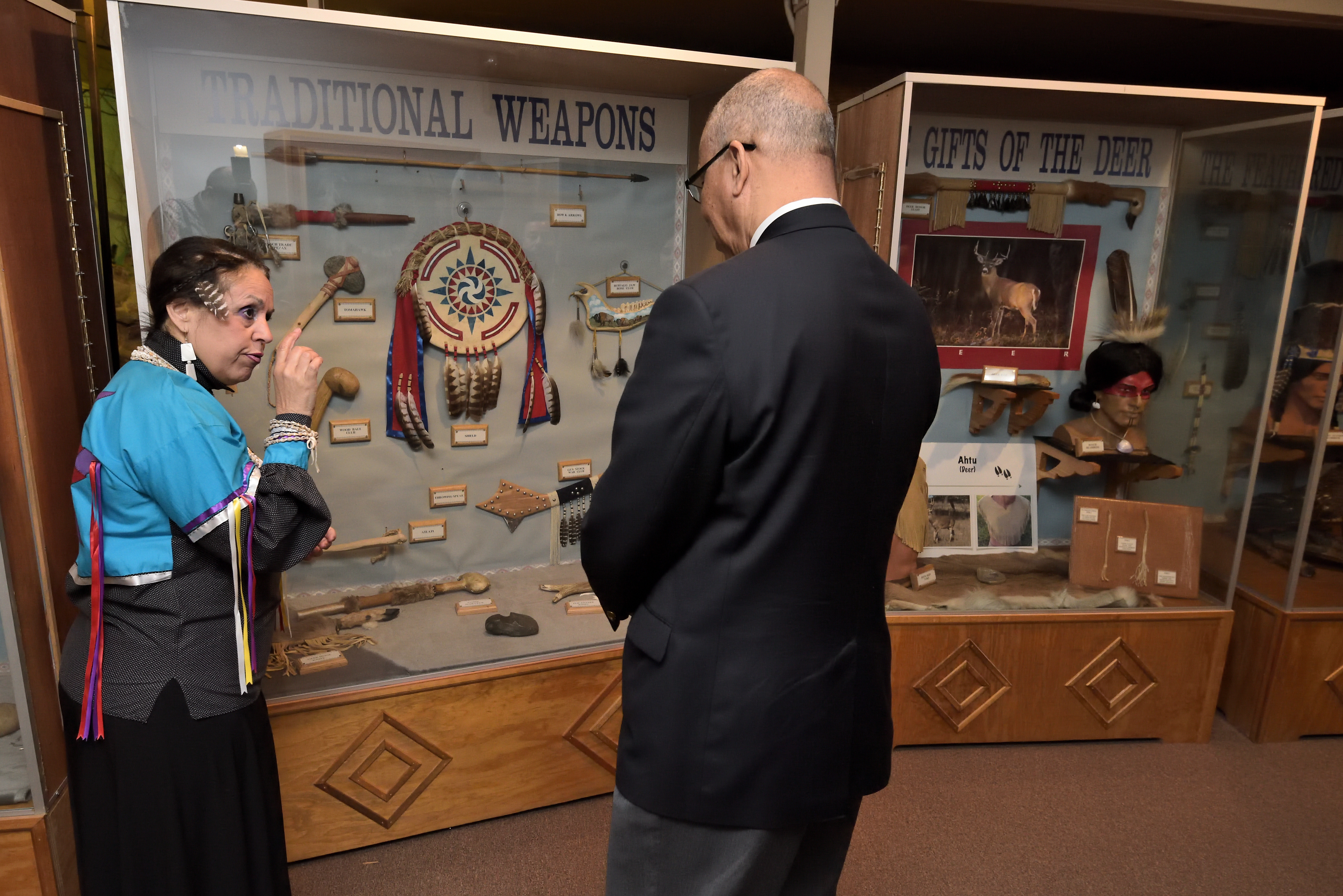
Boyd Rutherford, Lieutenant Governor of Maryland, at Piscataway Indian Museum and Cultural Center

Two branches of the Charles County Public Library are located in Waldorf: the P.D. Brown Memorial Branch, and the Waldorf West Branch.

The Piscataway Indian Nation operates a museum, a community center, and the Maryland Indian Cultural Center in Waldorf.

== Sports ==
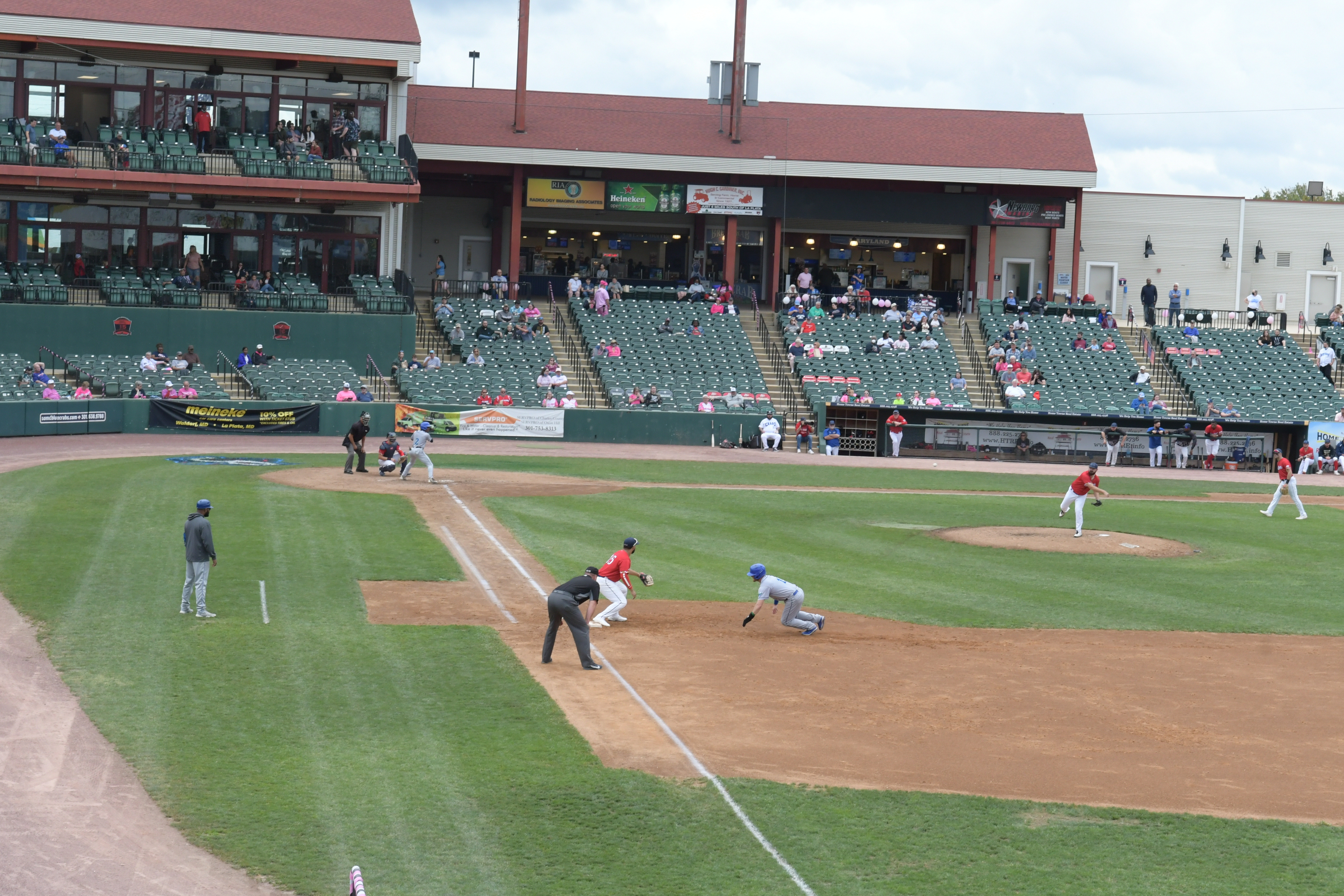
Southern Maryland Blue Crabs play at Regency Furniture Stadium, 2021

Regency Furniture Stadium is a 4,200 seat baseball park, soccer park and music concert center in Waldorf. The Southern Maryland Blue Crabs, established in 2006, complete in the Atlantic League of Professional Baseball and play at the stadium.

The Capital Clubhouse is a 90,000 square foot sports complex, including an ice skating rink and multi-sports center; a recreational ice rink, a hockey center and training facility, rock wall climbing gym, and numerous other sports and fitness gyms / fields in Waldorf.

== Education ==
Charles County Public Schools is the area school district.

Westlake High School, St. Charles High School, North Point High School, and Thomas Stone High School are public high schools in Waldorf.

St. Peter's School is a Catholic kindergarten through 8th grade school in Waldorf. Children of all faiths may attend. Grace Christian Academy is also in Waldorf and extends through high school grades. Archbishop Neale School is another Catholic school, that is accepting of all faiths, close to the Waldorf area in La Plata.

The Beddow School's Waldorf Montessori Campus is in Waldorf.

The largest one of the four campuses of College of Southern Maryland is located minutes away, between Waldorf and La Plata.

== Infrastructure ==
=== Transportation ===
==== Major routes ====
Major routes in Waldorf include U.S. Route 301 which is the main commercial thoroughfare and bisects Waldorf running northeast–southwest, the southern leg of Maryland Route 5 (Leonardtown Road) which starts in Waldorf and runs south into St. Mary's County, to Leonardtown and then beyond to eventually reach Point Lookout State Park. Maryland Route 228 (Berry Road) which starts at 301 and cuts west-northwest across to Indian Head Highway, Maryland Route 925 (Old Washington Road) which starts on the southern branch of Route 5 and runs 3 miles southwest to White Plains, and the St. Charles Parkway which bypasses the congested commercial zone, acting as a primarily residential thoroughfare, going mostly parallel to Route 301 running southwest from Route 5, eventually turning north to t-bone into route 301.

==== Transit and proposed rail line ====
Public transportation is provided by Van-Go, a bus system administered by Charles County for most of the county, including Waldorf, and interconnecting to nearby St.Mary's County Transit System buses. MTA Maryland has four commuter routes (901, 903, 905, and 907, all operated by Dillons Transportation except the 903 which is serviced by Keller Transportation) that take commuters to and from downtown Washington, D.C., and ridership is rapidly growing. Waldorf has seven park & ride lots served by MTA Maryland routes: two at St. Charles Towne Center, one at St. Charles Towne Plaza, one at Smallwood Drive and US 301, a very large one on Mattawoman Beantown Road, one at Smallwood Village Center, and one at Regency Furniture Stadium.

The Maryland Transit Administration is currently working with Prince George's County and Charles County in planning a transit line called Southern Maryland Rapid Transit, which would connect Waldorf to the Branch Avenue station of the Washington Metro.

=== Utilities ===
The Southern Maryland Electric Cooperative is the local electric company.

Waldorf is part of the water supply and sanitary service areas managed by Charles County's Department of Public Works, which operates more than 950 miles of water and sewer lines.

CPV St. Charles Energy Center operates a natural gas power plant in Waldorf, generating electricity for over 700,000 regional customers. The regional energy grid was previously served by the Morgantown Generating Station, a coal-fired plant that closed in 2022.

== Notable people ==
- William Waldorf Astor – politician, attorney, businessman and philanthropist; Waldorf (formerly "Beantown") was named after him
- Thomas M. Middleton – politician, former Maryland state senator and employees rights advocate, lives on / operates a farm in the Waldorf area
- Christina Milian – movie and television actress and US top 40 singer (top 3 in the UK) and songwriter. Grew up in Waldorf until she was 13. Came back to Waldorf to attend Westlake High School
- Herbert 'Herb' Kalin – musician and singer of 1950s rock and pop. Lived in Waldorf, died there and is buried at Trinity Memorial Gardens in Waldorf
- Joel and Benji Madden – from the band Good Charlotte grew up in Waldorf
- Paul Thomas – musician, bassist for the band Good Charlotte went to high school with the Madden brothers, born in Waldorf
- Robert Stethem – United States Navy Seabee diver. Was murdered by terrorists during the hijacking of TWA Flight 847 in 1985
- Jovan Adepo – British-American movie and television actor, raised in Waldorf
- Asante Blackk (Asante Duah Ma'at) – Emmy Award–winning actor, born in Waldorf
- John Flowers – professional international basketball player, born in Waldorf
- Marquis Wright – professional international basketball player. Went to North Point High School in Waldorf
- Adam Thorn – singer and front man, lyricist for indie-punk band Kudzu Wish. Born in Waldorf
- Ellie Stokes – professional soccer player, attended North Point High School in Waldorf
- Randy Starks – college and professional football player. Played for the Tennessee Titans, Miami Dolphins and Cleveland Browns. Played college football for the Maryland Terrapins at the University of Maryland, College Park. Grew up in Waldorf
- Marquel Lee – professional and college football player – plays for the Las Vegas Raiders and previously the Oakland Raiders. Played college football for Wake Forest University. Attended Westlake High School in Waldorf
- Shawn Lemon – professional football player for the Canadian Football League. Attended Westlake High school in Waldorf.
- David Hayes – professional and college soccer player, born in Waldorf
- Dr. Samuel Mudd – in 1865, gave medical assistance to the man who killed President Abraham Lincoln (who was then briefly hiding in what is now the Waldorf area)
- A.C. Crispin – science fiction writer
