= College of Southern Maryland =

Community college in Maryland, US

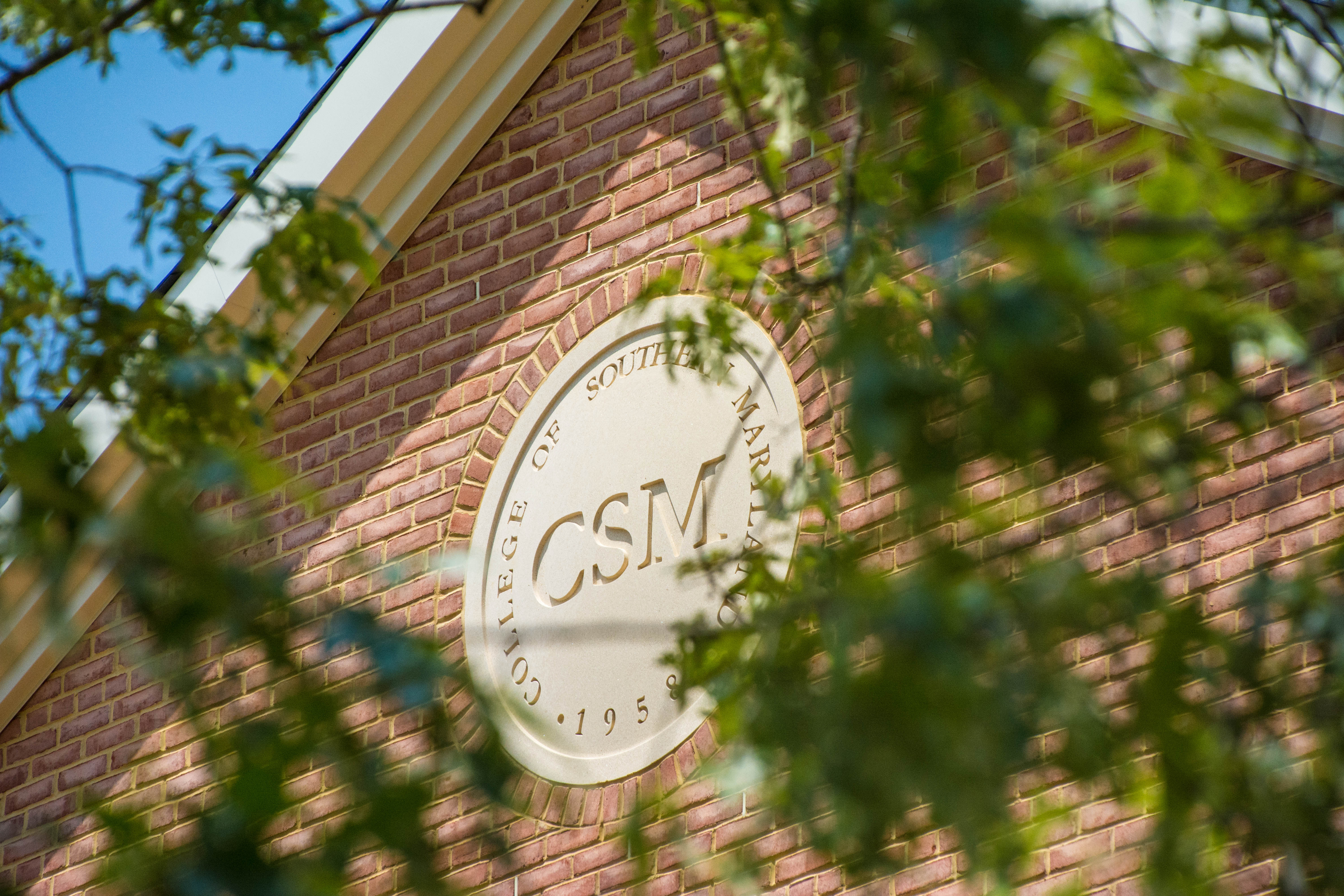
- Presidential Seal on a CSM Building
- Former names: Charles County Community College, Calvert County Community College, St. Mary's Community College
- Motto: Your Pathway to Possibility
- Type: Public community college
- Established: September 1, 1958; 67 years ago
- Chairman: Shawn B. Coates
- President: Dr. Yolanda Wilson
- Students: 14,329 (2023)
- Undergraduates: 7,622 (2023)
- Other students: 7,017 (2023)
- Location: La Plata, Hughesville, Leonardtown, Prince Frederick, Maryland, U.S. 38°33′34″N 77°0′33″W
- Campus: Rural, 173 acres (70 ha)
- Colors: Green, gold, black
- Sporting affiliations: National Junior College Athletic Association, Division II
- Mascot: Hawks
- Website: csmd.edu

The College of Southern Maryland (CSM) is a public community college with campuses in Hughesville, La Plata, Leonardtown, and Prince Frederick, Maryland. It serves students living in Southern Maryland's Charles, St. Mary's, and Calvert counties.

== History ==
In September 1958, the predecessor to today's CSM, Charles County Junior College, began evening classes at La Plata High School. In 1960, the college added an apprenticeship program. In 1968, Charles County Community College began construction of the Career Education and Administration Building on what is now the main CSM campus in La Plata, Maryland. On July 1, 2000, the college officially became the College of Southern Maryland.

== Academics ==
The College of Southern Maryland offers more than 120 programs of study including Associate of Arts, Associate of Science, and Associate of Applied Science degree programs. CSM has more than 300 transfer agreements with four-year colleges and universities. Furthermore, CSM offers a wide range of continuing education certificates and career training programs such as computer programming and repair, truck driving, and nursing.

=== Accreditation ===
CSM is accredited by the Middle States Commission on Higher Education. Its business, physical therapy, and nursing programs have specialized accreditation by Accreditation Council for Business Schools and Programs, American Physical Therapy Association, and National League for Nursing, respectively.

== Campus and training facilities ==
The Charles County facilities include the La Plata Campus in La Plata, the Regional Hughesville Campus in Hughesville, the Center for Transportation Training in Waldorf, and the Velocity Center at Indian Head.

The St. Mary's County campus is located in Leonardtown.

The Calvert County campus is located in Prince Frederick.

=== La Plata Campus ===
The La Plata Campus is home to 14 buildings and houses a bookstore, conference center, a fine arts center with a 400-seat auditorium, computer laboratories, a distance learning center, a library, and a fitness center.

The Southern Maryland Studies Center, a regional archives repository and research center, is located in the CSM library.

=== Leonardtown Campus ===
The Community College of St. Mary's County was established in 1978 at Great Mills High School. The campus was moved to its current location in 1997, which includes four buildings—Buildings A, B, C, and D. The campus has an auditorium/seminar room, science labs, a fitness center and a pool, the latter two of which are available for student and community use.

=== Prince Frederick Campus ===
The Community College at Calvert County, established in 1980, moved to its current location on J.W. Williams Road in Prince Frederick in 2005. The main building is a two-story, 56,000-square-foot (5,200 m^{2}) construction, which includes 15 classrooms, 6 computer labs, and a 2,951-square-foot (274.2 m^{2}) library.

The B Building is a two-story 30,000-square-foot (2,800 m^{2}) construction, which includes student services, seven computer labs and classrooms, the newly expanded wellness center, the Nuclear Energy Training Center, and is the college's first LEED certified building with four green roofs.

=== Regional Hughesville Campus ===
On February 27, 2013, the College of Southern Maryland announced it had purchased 74 acres in Hughesville to build another campus. The first phase was the construction of the 30,000-square-foot (2,800 m^{2}) Center for Trades and Energy Training (CTET).

The second phase, concluded in 2023, included the construction of the 50,000-square-foot Center for Health Sciences, which includes specialized health sciences labs and classrooms.

=== Velocity Center at Indian Head ===
The Velocity Center at Indian Head, operated and managed by CSM, is a 13,000-square-foot facility located outside of the Naval Surface Warfare Center, Indian Head Division (NSWC IHD). It includes classrooms, conference rooms, and a makerspace.

== Intercollegiate sports ==
The College of Southern Maryland has four intercollegiate men's teams and four intercollegiate women's teams that compete in the NJCAA, Division II. The men's teams include baseball, basketball, soccer, and golf. The women's teams include basketball, soccer, softball, and volleyball.
