= La Plata High School =

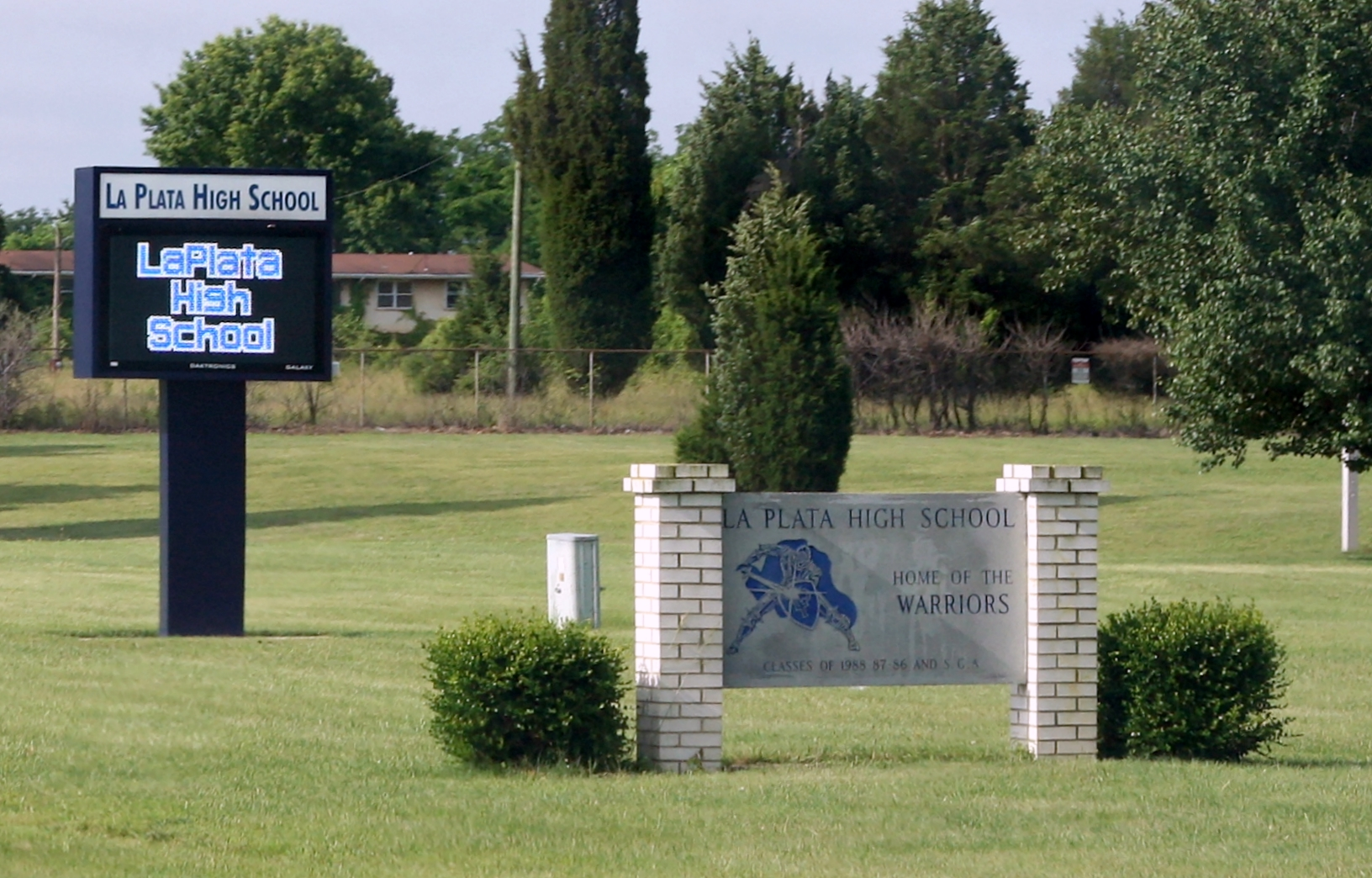

Location
- 6035 Radio Station Road; La Plata, Maryland 20646; United States; 38°32′46.1″N 76°57′1.4″W

Information
- Established: 1927
- Principal: Douglass Dolan
- Staff: 72.00 (FTE)
- Grades: 9-12
- Student to teacher ratio: 15.39
- Colors: Navy Blue and White ██
- Athletics conference: Southern Maryland Athletic Conference
- Mascot: Warrior
- Feeder Schools: Piccowaxen, Somers
- Website: https://www.ccboe.com/schools/laplata/

La Plata High School is part of the Charles County Public Schools and is located in La Plata, Maryland, United States. The current school was built in 1979. Before that, it was in the building (built in 1964) which now holds Milton M. Somers Middle School.

== History ==
On November 9, 1926, the La Plata Elementary School was destroyed by a tornado that killed 13 students. That two room building was replaced by a new school that housed both an elementary and high school for La Plata.

The school opened in 1927, taking over from the McDonough Institute, which was Charles County's first high school. The school was segregated by race. In 1958, the Charles County Community College began meeting at La Plata High School. This college would eventually evolve into the College of Southern Maryland, with the college moving to a campus on Mitchell Road west of La Plata in 1968.

In 1964, around 50 students from the all-black Bel Alton High School integrated La Plata High School under the security of FBI agents. The county began desegregation in earnest in 1966. In 1969, African American students protested racial injustice in the school after the school did not allow African Americans to become majorettes. Students organized a sit-in and a walk-out, and were punished by not being given their diplomas during graduation. The students received their diplomas in 2021 after a special ceremony. In 2022, a Confederate flag was found flying outside of the school by JROTC members, prompting an investigation by the Charles County Sheriff's Office.

The school moved to Oak Avenue in 1964 into the building which is now Milton M. Somers Middle School. The school moved to its present location on Radio Station Road in 1979. Plans for renovations, including the addition of a natatorium, have occurred in the 2020s.

== Academics ==
Advanced Placement courses are offered at La Plata, with an AP participation rate of 41% as of 2024.

Extracurricular activities include Key Club, band and orchestra, Envirothon, and student government, among others.

The represented JROTC branch at La Plata is the U.S. Navy.

== Demographics ==
As of 2025, La Plata High School has an enrollment of 1,217 students with a demographic profile of 52.67% White, 26.79% Black, 2.55% Asian or Pacific Islander 9.37% Hispanic, 0.33% American Indian, and 7.89% Other Races.

== Sports ==
La Plata is a member of the Southern Maryland Athletic Conference.

The school won state championships in baseball in 2008, 2016, 2019, and 2021. In women's basketball, La Plata won a state championship in 1977.

In marching band, the Marching Warriors were USBands group 2A state champions in 2023.

== Notable alumni ==
- Matt Dyson, American football coach and a former player
- William Daniel Mayer, former member of Maryland House of Delegates
- Van Mitchell, politician
- Don Money, baseball player
- Paul Thomas, Joel Madden and Benji Madden are members of the band Good Charlotte.
- Daryl Thompson, baseball player
- Zuberi Williams, judge
- Allyn Rose, Miss Maryland USA 2011
