= St. Charles High School (Maryland) =

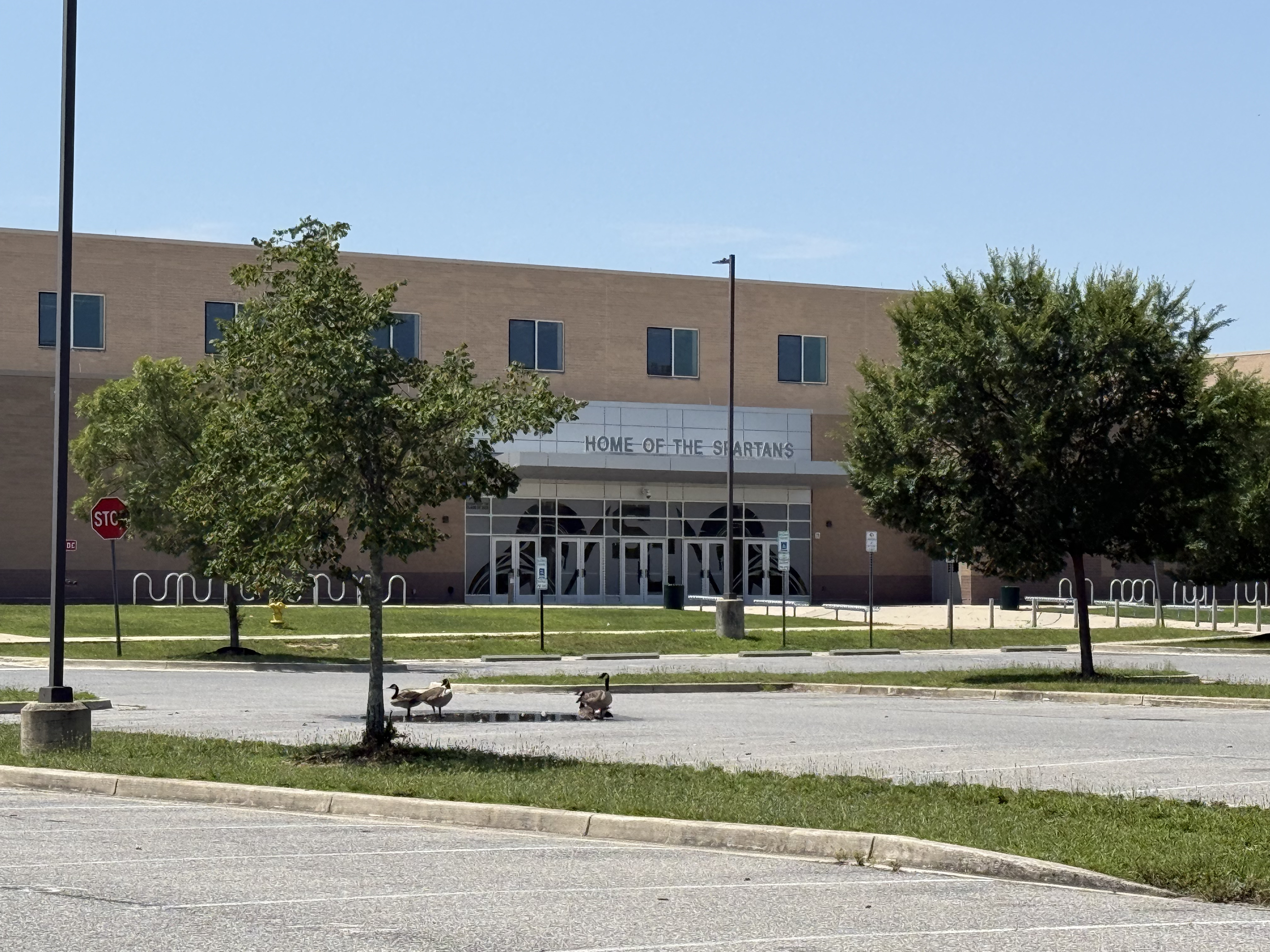

Location
- 5305 Piney Church Road; Waldorf, Maryland 20602; United States
- 38°34′01″N 76°54′32″W

Information
- School type: Public, secondary school
- Founded: 2014
- School district: Charles County Public Schools
- Principal: Tammika Little
- Teaching staff: 96 (FTE)
- Grades: 9–12
- Enrollment: 1617 (2024-25)
- Student to teacher ratio: 16.84
- Language: English
- Campus: Suburban
- Colors: Kelly green, navy blue, and white
- Athletics conference: Southern Maryland Athletic Conference
- Mascot: Spartan
- Website: stcharles.ccboe.com

St. Charles High School is a public high school located in the St. Charles area of Waldorf, Maryland. It is a part of the Charles County Public Schools school district. It is the district's newest high school, having opened in 2014. Located on campus is the James E. Richmond Science Center, a science education center serving Southern Maryland. The school is adjacent to Regency Furniture Stadium.

== History ==
The school was constructed by firm HESS Construction, earning an award for best project from Engineering News Record-Mid Atlantic in 2015.

The school opened in August 2014, with its first principal being Richard Conley. The school's first class graduated in 2016.

In 2025, the school resource officer charged six students with assault after an altercation.

== Demographics ==
The school is minority-majority, with the racial makeup being:

- 71% African American
- 13% Hispanic
- 7% Two or more races
- 6% White
- 2% Asian
- <1% American Indian/Alaska Native

The school is 48% economically disadvantaged, with 41% being on free lunch and 7% on reduced lunch.

According to National Center for Education Statistics data, the school had 821 males and 796 females during the 2024–2025 school year.

== Sports ==
The school is a member of the Southern Maryland Athletic Conference (SMAC).

The Daniel M. Wade Aquatic Center is a public swimming pool located on campus.

The DMV Soldiers, a semi-professional basketball team in The Basketball League, hosts home games in the St. Charles gymnasium.

== Music ==
The St. Charles High School Marching Spartans became state champions at the 2025 USBands Maryland and Virginia State Championships at Calvert Hall College High School. Additionally, the Spartans placed first in the Regional A category at the 2024 and 2025 USBands Marine Corps Invitational. The school also placed first at the 2025 USBands Mid-Atlantic regional.

St. Charles has hosted the Charles County Band and Orchestra Instant Concert, an event where high school musicians mentor elementary school beginners and perform a concert together. The participants hail from schools across Charles County.

== James E. Richmond Science Center ==
The James E. Richmond Science Center is located on campus. The facility hosts school groups, family and community events. Amenities include a 184-seat dome theater, a "NOAA Science on a Sphere," a laboratory, a science gallery, and two satellites.

== Notable alumni ==
- William Kwenkeu, American football player
