= List of former Maryland state highways (400–499) =

Highway names
- Interstates: Interstate X (I-X)
- US Highways: U.S. Route X (US X)
- State: Maryland Route X (MD X)
- Former state highways: 2–199; 200–399; 400–499; 500–599; 600–699; 700–999

System links
- Maryland highway system; Interstate; US; State; Scenic Byways

The Maryland highway system has several hundred former state highways. These highways were constructed, maintained, or funded by the Maryland State Roads Commission or Maryland State Highway Administration and assigned a unique or temporally unique number. Sometime after the highway was assigned, the highway was transferred to county or municipal maintenance and the number designation was removed from the particular stretch of road. In some cases, a highway was renumbered in whole or in part. This list contains all or most of the state-numbered highways between 400 and 499 that have existed since highways were first numbered in 1927 but are no longer part of the state highway system or are state highways of a different number. Most former state highways have not had their numbers reused. However, many state highway numbers were used for a former highway and are currently in use. Some numbers have been used three times. The former highways below whose numbers are used presently, those that were taken over in whole or in part by another highway, or have enough information to warrant a separate article contain links to those separate highway articles. Highway numbers that have two or more former uses are differentiated below by year ranges. This list does not include former Interstate or U.S. Highways, which are linked from their respective lists.

== MD 400 ==
Maryland Route 400
- Location: Garrison
- Existed: 1930–1991

Maryland Route 400 was the designation for Mount Wilson Lane, which ran from MD 140 west to the Western Maryland Railway (now CSX's Hanover Subdivision) and the former Mount Wilson Hospital Center near Garrison in western Baltimore County. The highway was paved as a concrete road in 1930. MD 400 was removed from the state highway system in 1991.

== MD 401 ==
Maryland Route 401
- Location: Butler
- Existed: 1932–1987

Maryland Route 401 was the designation for Stringtown Road from MD 25 east to Yeoho Road near Butler in northern Baltimore County. The highway was constructed as a macadam road in two segments in 1932 and 1933. MD 401 was removed from the state highway system in 1987.

== MD 403 ==
Maryland Route 403
- Location: Hyattsville–Riverdale
- Existed: 1942–1956

Maryland Route 403 was the designation for what was then named Colesville Road, which ran from MD 500 in Hyattsville east to US 1 in Riverdale in northern Prince George's County. Colesville Road was constructed as a modern highway between 1940 and 1942. MD 403 was resurfaced in 1954, shortly before the highway was taken over by MD 410 when that highway's modern alignment through Hyattsville was completed in 1956.

== MD 403 (1930) ==
Maryland Route 403
- Location: Level
- Existed: 1930–1942

Maryland Route 403 was the designation for a loop off of MD 155 west of MD 161 via Level Village Road. It was deleted in 1942. It appears on a 1937 map and a Maryland SRC operating budget.

== MD 406 ==
Maryland Route 406
- Location: Hudson Corner–West Pocomoke
- Existed: 1930–1961

Maryland Route 406 was the designation for Rehobeth Road from MD 667 at Hudson Corner east to US 13 in West Pocomoke in southern Somerset County. The first section of MD 406 was completed east from what was then MD 413 in 1930. MD 406 was taken over by MD 667 when that highway's terminus was shifted from Westover to West Pocomoke in 1961.

== MD 408 ==
Maryland Route 408
- Location: Edgewood
- Existed: 1930–1952

Maryland Route 408 was the designation for Edgewood Road from the Edgewood Arsenal (now part of Aberdeen Proving Ground) north to MD 7 in Edgewood in southern Harford County. The highway was built as a concrete road south from US 40 (now MD 7) in the community of Van Bibber south to the military installation in 1930. MD 408 was constructed with a width of 16 feet (4.9 m) but was proposed for widening to 20 feet (6.1 m) as early as 1934. The highway received an underpass of the Baltimore & Ohio Railroad (now CSX's Philadelphia Subdivision) and approaches to the grade separation in 1939. MD 24 assumed all of MD 408 when MD 24 was extended south from MD 7 to Aberdeen Proving Ground in 1952. Much of what had been MD 408 is now part of MD 755.

== MD 409 ==
Maryland Route 409
- Location: Freeland–Maryland Line
- Existed: 1930–1991

Maryland Route 409 was the designation for Freeland Road from the Northern Central Railway at Freeland to east of I-83 at Maryland Line in far northern Baltimore County. The highway was constructed as a concrete road from Freeland to US 111 (now MD 45) in 1929 and 1930. MD 409 was extended east through the I-83 interchange after the freeway was built between Parkton and the Pennsylvania state line in 1958 and 1959. The highway was removed from the state highway system in 1991.

== MD 411 ==
Maryland Route 411
- Location: Mount Rainier–Hyattsville
- Existed: 1930–c. 1946

Maryland Route 411 was the designation for Rhode Island Avenue from former MD 206 (now MD 208, which follows 38th Street) in Brentwood east to US 1 (now US 1 Alternate) in Hyattsville in northern Prince George's County. The portion of Rhode Island Avenue from the District of Columbia east to 38th Street was built as a concrete road as part of MD 206 between 1916 and 1919. The remainder of MD 206 along 38th Street to Cottage City is now part of MD 208. MD 411 was constructed as a concrete road in 1929 and 1930 from Brentwood to Hyattsville. By 1934, the 20-foot-wide (6.1 m) highway was proposed to be expanded to 40 feet (12 m) because it carried an average of 19,105 vehicles per day. MD 411 was widened to 36 feet (11 m) from Brentwood to Hyattsville between 1938 and 1940. The MD 411 designation may have been extended west from 38th Street to the District boundary by 1939. Rhode Island Avenue also may have been part of US 1 Alternate and US 50 Alternate; US 1 and US 50 then entered the city along Bladensburg Road. The MD 411 designation was removed when US 1 was placed on Rhode Island Avenue from Washington, D.C., to Hyattsville by 1946; old US 1 along Baltimore Avenue and Bladensburg Road became US 1 Alternate.

== MD 412 ==
Maryland Route 412
- Location: Riverdale
- Existed: 1930–1991

Maryland Route 412 was the designation for Riverdale Road from US 1 east to MD 201 in Riverdale. The highway was constructed as a concrete road in 1929 and 1930. At the Baltimore & Ohio Railroad, MD 412 used one-block portions of Rhode Island Avenue, Queensbury Road, and Lafayette Avenue to connect with the segments of Riverdale Road on either side of the tracks. However, by 1956, the highway used Queensbury Road west to US 1 in the 1950s before reverting to Riverdale Road around 1963. The highway was truncated on the east side of the railroad in 1978. MD 412 was removed from the state highway system in 1991.

== MD 415 ==
Maryland Route 415
- Location: Scotland
- Existed: 1930–1956

Maryland Route 415 was the designation for Scotland Beach Road from MD 5 east to the Chesapeake Bay shore near Scotland in far southern St. Mary's County. The highway was constructed as a gravel road in 1930. MD 415 was removed from the state highway system in 1956.

== MD 416 ==
Maryland Route 416
- Location: Sunderland–Waysons Corner
- Existed: 1930–1965

Maryland Route 416 was the designation for Southern Maryland Boulevard from MD 2 in Sunderland north to MD 4 at Waysons Corner in northern Calvert County and southern Anne Arundel County. Southern Maryland Boulevard was constructed as an 18-foot-wide (5.5 m) concrete road on a new alignment in 1929 and 1930. MD 416 was widened to 22 feet (6.7 m) along its whole length and resurfaced in 1948. The highway was relocated at Lyons Creek at the county line between 1953 and 1956. MD 416 was expanded to a divided highway from Waysons Corner to south of Lyons Creek in 1962 concurrent with the construction of MD 4's bypass of Upper Marlboro. In 1960, MD 416 was extended south from Sunderland on a long concurrency with MD 2 to the latter highway's terminus at Solomons. In 1965, MD 416 was replaced by MD 4 from Waysons Corner to Solomons; the portion of MD 4 east of Waysons Corner became MD 408.

== MD 417 ==
Maryland Route 417
- Location: Grantsville
- Existed: 1930–1963

Maryland Route 417 was the designation for Springs Road from US 40 (now US 40 Alternate north to the Pennsylvania state line in Grantsville in northern Garrett County. The highway went under construction in 1930 and was completed as a concrete road by 1933. MD 417 was replaced by MD 669 to match the adjacent Pennsylvania Route 669 in 1963.

== MD 419 ==
Maryland Route 419
- Location: Dickerson
- Existed: 1930–1959

Maryland Route 419 was the designation for a pair of highways near Dickerson in western Montgomery County. One highway followed Mount Ephraim Road from MD 28 at Dickerson north to near the intersection of Mount Ephraim Road and Sugarloaf Mountain Road. The other used Martinsburg Road from MD 28 south to where Martinsburg Road curves south near the Potomac River. Both segments of MD 419 were constructed in two sections. The northern MD 419 was constructed as a concrete road from MD 28 to north of Barnesville Road in 1929 and 1930. The highway was extended to its northern terminus in 1931 and 1932. The southern MD 419 was built as a concrete road from MD 28 to near Wasche Road in 1929 and 1930. The highway was extended as a macadam road to where Martinsburg Road bends south near the Potomac River in 1931 and 1932. Both segments of MD 419 were removed from the state highway system in 1959.

== MD 420 ==
Maryland Route 420
- Location: Laytonsville
- Existed: 1930–1974

Maryland Route 420 was the designation for Brink Road from Goshen Road east to MD 108 in Laytonsville and Sundown Road from MD 108 east to a spot east of Laytonsville in northern Montgomery County. The portion of the highway between MD 124 and MD 108 was constructed in concrete as part of MD 124 between 1925 and 1927. MD 420 was built as a concrete road from MD 124 west to Goshen Road in 1929 and 1930. The section of the highway east of MD 108 was paved in 1939 and designated MD 701. MD 701 was replaced by MD 420 in 1952. In 1959, MD 124 was moved to its present alignment, replacing its old course along Warfield Road, Laytonsville Road, and Brink Road. MD 420 replaced MD 124 along Brink Road; at the same time, the portion of MD 420 between MD 124 and Goshen Road was transferred to county maintenance. The remainder of MD 420 was removed from the state highway system in 1974.

== MD 421 ==
Maryland Route 421
- Location: Travilah
- Existed: 1930–1959

Maryland Route 421 was the designation for Travilah Road from MD 190 north to Glen Road near Travilah in southwestern Montgomery County. The highway was paved as a macadam road in 1929 and 1930. MD 421 was removed from the state highway system in 1959.

== MD 426 ==
Maryland Route 426
- Location: Nanjemoy
- Existed: 1930–1956

Maryland Route 426 was the designation for Liverpool Point Road from the Potomac River east to MD 6 in Nanjemoy in western Charles County. The highway was constructed was a gravel road in two sections. The first was built from Nanjemoy, then known as Cross Road, west toward Liverpool starting in 1930. The route was extended to the Potomac River in 1933. MD 426 was removed from the state highway system in 1956.

== MD 427 ==
Maryland Route 427
- Location: Bel Alton
- Existed: 1930–1989

Maryland Route 427 was the designation for Chapel Point Road, which ran from the Port Tobacco River in Chapel Point State Park east to US 301 at Bel Alton in southern Charles County. The highway was constructed was a gravel road in two sections. The first was built from Bel Alton west toward Chapel Point starting in 1930. The route was completed to Chapel Point in 1933. MD 427 was removed from the state highway system in 1989.

== MD 428 ==
Maryland Route 428
- Location: Newport–Dentsville
- Existed: 1930–1956

Maryland Route 428 was the designation for Penns Hill Road, which ran from MD 234 near Newport north to MD 6 in Dentsville in southern Charles County. The highway was built as a gravel road in three sections. The first section of MD 428 started construction at the Newport end in 1930. The second section was completed in 1933. The highway was completed from Newport to Dentsville in 1936. MD 428 was removed from the state highway system in 1956.

== MD 429 ==
Maryland Route 429
- Location: Popes Creek–Faulkner
- Existed: 1930–1956

Maryland Route 429 was the designation for Popes Creek Road, which ran from Popes Creek on the Potomac River north to US 301 at Faulkner in southern Charles County. The highway was built as a gravel road in two sections. The first section was constructed south from Faulkner in 1929 and 1930. Construction continued in 1930 and was completed to Popes Creek by 1933. MD 429 was removed from the state highway system in 1956.

== MD 431 ==
Maryland Route 431
- Location: Drayden
- Existed: 1933–1956

Maryland Route 431 was the designation for Cherryfield Road, which ran from MD 244 (now simply Drayden Road) south to the end of state maintenance in southern St. Mary's County. The highway was constructed as a gravel road by 1933. MD 431 was removed from the state highway system in 1956.

== MD 432 ==
Maryland Route 432
- Location: Clarksburg
- Existed: 1929–1959

Maryland Route 432 was the designation for Hawkes Road from Stringtown Road east to MD 27 near Clarksburg in northern Montgomery County. The highway was constructed as a concrete road in 1929. MD 432 was removed from the state highway system in 1959.

== MD 433 (1930–1946) ==
Maryland Route 433
- Location: Beltsville
- Existed: 1930–c. 1946

Maryland Route 433 was the designation for Powder Mill Road on both side of US 1 in Beltsville in northern Prince George's County. The portion west from US 1 toward Montgomery Road was paved as a concrete road starting in 1930. That road and a macadam road east from US 1 to the U.S. Government Agricultural Farm were completed by 1933. The route was relocated just east of US 1 when Powder Mill Road was placed on its present bridge across the Baltimore & Ohio Railroad (now CSX's Capital Subdivision) in 1939. MD 433 was replaced by an eastward extension of MD 212 by 1946.

== MD 433 (1948–1958) ==
Maryland Route 433
- Location: Federalsburg
- Existed: 1948–1958

Maryland Route 433 was the designation for Smithville Road from north of Federalsburg toward Smithville in southern Caroline County. The highway was constructed as a gravel road in 1948. MD 433 was removed from the state highway system in 1958.

== MD 434 ==
Maryland Route 434
- Location: College Park–Berwyn Heights
- Existed: 1942–1991

Maryland Route 434 was the designation for Berwyn Road, 57th Avenue, and Pontiac Street from US 1 in College Park east to MD 201 in Berwyn Heights in northern Prince George's County. The highway was constructed as a concrete road starting in 1930 and completed by 1933, and was designated MD 430. In 1942, MD 430 was relocated to its and MD 193's present alignment from US 1 to MD 205 (now MD 201) after its bridge across the Baltimore & Ohio Railroad opened, eliminating grade crossings on county-maintained Branchville Road and on state-maintained Berwyn Road. MD 434 was assigned to the streets in College Park and Berwyn Heights by 1946. The highway on the College Park side of the railroad was widened and resurfaced in 1957. This stretch was transferred to city maintenance in 1962. The remainder of MD 434 was removed from the state highway system in 1991.

== MD 437 ==
Maryland Route 437
- Location: Annapolis
- Existed: 1930–1975

Maryland Route 437 was the designation for Ridgely Avenue from MD 435 north to Melvin Avenue in Annapolis. Ridgely Avenue was one of several streets paved in concrete in the West Annapolis area in 1929 and 1930. MD 437, which was originally named Revell Avenue, was removed from the state highway system in 1975 when it was replaced by MD 436.

== MD 438 ==
Maryland Route 438
- Location: Annapolis
- Existed: 1930–1975

Maryland Route 438 was the designation for a pair of routings in Annapolis. Both of its routings in the West Annapolis neighborhood were included in several streets paved in concrete in West Annapolis in 1929 and 1930. MD 438 originally began at the intersection of Annapolis Street and Melvin Avenue (then named Severn Avenue). MD 435 used Annapolis Street and Severn Avenue south and east of the intersection, respectively. MD 438 followed Melvin Avenue west one block, then turned north onto Revell Avenue (now Ridgely Avenue) and followed that street to the north of Weems Creek. In 1954, MD 438 was fully replaced by MD 436 and reassigned to Melvin Avenue from the Annapolis– Melvin intersection east to Wardour Drive. This portion of Melvin Avenue had previously been part of MD 435. MD 438 was removed from the state highway system in 1975.

== MD 441 ==
Maryland Route 441
- Location: Fair Hill
- Length: 0.50 mi (800 m)
- Existed: 1938–1958

Maryland Route 441 was the designation for Providence Road, which ran 0.50 miles (0.80 km) from Little Elk Creek east to MD 280 (now MD 213) near Fair Hill in northeastern Cecil County. The highway was paved by 1938. MD 441 was transferred from state to county maintenance through a May 8, 1958, road transfer agreement.

== MD 442 ==
Maryland Route 442
- Location: Betterton
- Length: 0.36 mi (580 m)
- Existed: 1930–1987

Maryland Route 442 was the designation for Royal Swan Road, which ran 0.36 miles (0.58 km) from MD 292 east to Rosedale Cannery Road near Betterton in northern Kent County. MD 442 was built as a concrete road starting in 1930. It was one of several highways constructed by the Maryland State Roads Commission as 9-foot (2.7 m) or 16-foot-wide (4.9 m) concrete roads through a $900,000 Kent County bond issue in 1929 and 1930. MD 442 was transferred from state to county maintenance through a December 1, 1987, road transfer agreement.

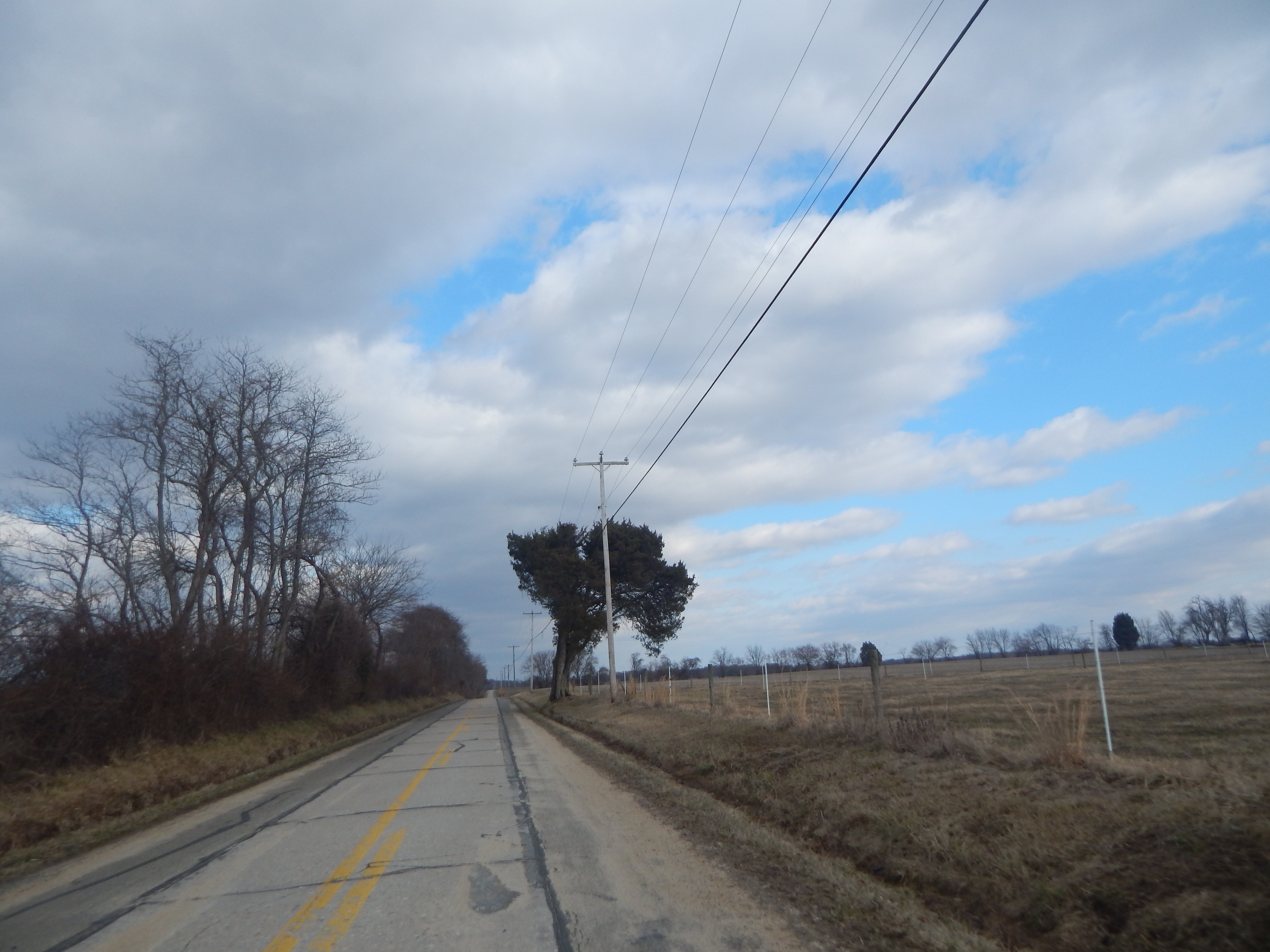
Former MD 442 in March 2015

== MD 443 ==
Maryland Route 443
- Location: Betterton
- Length: 0.88 mi (1,420 m)
- Existed: 1930–1987

Maryland Route 443 was the designation for Still Pond Neck Road, which ran 0.88 miles (1.42 km) from MD 292 near Betterton west to Clark Road at the hamlet of Coleman in northern Kent County. MD 443 was built as a concrete road starting in 1930. It was one of several highways constructed by the Maryland State Roads Commission as 9-foot (2.7 m) or 16-foot-wide (4.9 m) concrete roads through a $900,000 Kent County bond issue in 1929 and 1930. MD 443 was transferred from state to county maintenance through a December 1, 1987, road transfer agreement.

== MD 447 (1930–1963) ==
Maryland Route 447
- Location: Chestertown–Chesterville
- Length: 10.35 mi (16.66 km)
- Existed: 1930–1963

Maryland Route 447 was the designation for Morgnec Road, which ran 10.35 miles (16.66 km) from US 213 in Chestertown east to MD 290 in Chesterville in Kent County. MD 447 was one of several state highways whose construction as 9-and-16-foot-wide (2.7 and 4.9 m) concrete roads was partially funded by a $900,000 Kent County bond issue in 1929. The highway from Chestertown to Morgnec and from Kennedyville Road—which was MD 448—to Chesterville was constructed in 1929 and 1930. The gap between Morgnec and Kennedyville Road was filled between 1930 and 1933. Through a May 14, 1958, road transfer agreement, the county agreed to accept the portion of MD 447 from Morgnec to Chesterville after the state completed constructed on River Road as a westward extension of MD 291 from MD 290 south of Chesterville. The portion of MD 447 from Chestertown to the western end of the MD 291 extension west of Morgnec became part of MD 291 when the River Road constructed was completed in 1963. The east–west and north–south bypassed portions of Morgnec Road at Morgnec became MD 859B and MD 291B, respectively. Two segments of the Morgnec–Chesterville highway were later returned to state maintenance. The portion of Morgnec Road between Browntown Road and Cherry Lane was returned to state control as an extension of MD 298 through a December 1, 1987, road transfer agreement. The segment of the highway from Locust Grove Road to MD 290 was brought back into the state system as an extension of MD 444 through a June 1, 1993, road transfer agreement.

== MD 447 (1969–1987) ==
Maryland Route 447
- Location: Locust Grove
- Length: 0.84 mi (1,350 m)
- Existed: 1969–1987

Maryland Route 447 was the designation for Old Locust Grove Road, which ran 0.84 miles (1.35 km) from MD 213 northwest to MD 444 at Locust Grove in northern Kent County. The roads on which MD 447 ran were built in two sections. The portion from US 213 to Shallcross Wharf Road and Shallcross Wharf Road west from Locust Grove were part of the original Chestertown–Galena highway proposed for improvement as a state road in 1909. This stretch was constructed as a 12-foot-wide (3.7 m) macadam road in 1913. The section from Shallcross Wharf Road to MD 444 is the original alignment of the Kentmore Park Road portion of MD 444. The highway was improved in 1939 and brought into the state highway system as a northward extension of that route in 1942. After US 213's bypass of Locust Grove was built in 1950 and 1951, the old path of US 213 through Locust Grove—Shallcross Wharf Road between the western end of the bypass and the center of Locust Grove, and Old Locust Grove Road between the center of Locust Grove and the eastern end of the bypass—became part of MD 444, with the eastern section being a spur of the main route. After MD 444's present course west of Locust Grove was constructed in 1968, Old Locust Grove Road became MD 447 and Shallcross Wharf Road between US 213 and the new MD 447 became MD 449. MD 447 was resurfaced with bituminous concrete in 1984. Three years later, MD 447 was transferred from state to county maintenance through a December 1, 1987, road transfer agreement.

== MD 448 ==
Maryland Route 448
- Location: Kennedyville
- Length: 5.94 mi (9.56 km)
- Existed: 1930–1987

Maryland Route 448 was the designation for Kennedyville Road and Turners Creek Road, which ran 5.94 miles (9.56 km) from Morgnec Road south of Kennedyville north to the end of state maintenance near Turners Creek, a tributary of the Sassafras River, in northern Kent County. The highway was constructed as a concrete road from Morgnec Road to US 213 in Kennedyville in 1929 and 1930. That segment was one of several state highways, including MD 447 along Morgnec Road, whose construction as 9-and-16-foot-wide (2.7 and 4.9 m) concrete roads was partially funded by a $900,000 Kent County bond issue in 1929. The portion of the highway north of Kennedyville was constructed as the original MD 662. The first 1.5-mile-long (2.4 km) section of MD 662 was improved as a macadam road in 1936 and 1938 and brought into the state highway system in 1939. The second 1.5-mile-long (2.4 km) section of the highway was improved as a macadam road in 1940. Late in 1945, the 413-foot-long (126 m) piece of 16-foot-wide (4.9 m) stabilized gravel road between the railroad crossing and the intersection of US 213 and MD 448 in Kennedyville was brought into the state highway system. By the next year, MD 662 had been subsumed by a northward extension of MD 448. The highway was resurfaced with bituminous concrete from MD 213 in Kennedyville to its northern terminus in 1973. MD 448 was transferred from state to county maintenance through a December 1, 1987, road transfer agreement.

== MD 449 ==
Maryland Route 449
- Location: Perryville
- Length: 0.53 mi (850 m)
- Existed: c. 1934–1958

Maryland Route 449 was the designation for Aiken Avenue Extended and Clayton Street, which spanned 0.53 miles (0.85 km) in Perryville in western Cecil County. Aiken Avenue Extended ran from US 222 (now MD 222 at that highway's modern intersection with US 40 north to the Baltimore & Ohio Railroad (now CSX's Philadelphia Subdivision), and Clayton Street extended from the railroad northeast to US 222. MD 449 was the old course of MD 268, which was replaced by a southern extension of US 222 in 1938. MD 449 was assigned to old MD 268 when MD 268's grade crossing of the Baltimore & Ohio Railroad was replaced by a bridge at the hamlet of Aiken (also spelled Aikin) between 1931 and 1934. Both sections of MD 449 were transferred from state to county maintenance in a May 8, 1958, road transfer agreement.

== MD 450 ==
Maryland Route 450
- Location: Caroline County
- Existed: 1930–1939

Maryland Route 450 was the designation for Greenwood Road between MD 404 in Andersontown and the Delaware state line in Caroline County. MD 450 was constructed between 1930 and 1933. The route was replaced by an extension of MD 16 by 1939.

== MD 451 ==
Maryland Route 451
- Location: Claiborne
- Existed: 1930–1998

Maryland Route 451 was the designation for Claiborne Road between MD 33 and a boat landing in Claiborne in western Talbot County. The highway was originally constructed as the westernmost part of the original MD 17 around 1920; Claiborne was the eastern end of the Claiborne–Annapolis ferry. MD 17 became MD 33 in 1940. The original course of MD 451 is now the portion of MD 33 between Claiborne and Tilghman Island, which was constructed between 1930 and 1934. MD 33 replaced MD 451 from Claiborne to Tilghman Island and MD 451 was placed on Claiborne Road in 1957. MD 451 was removed from the state highway system in 1998.

== MD 453 ==
Maryland Route 453
- Location: Woodmont
- Existed: 1930–1956

Maryland Route 453 was the designation for Woodmont Road from Pearre Road at Woodmont near the Potomac River north to US 40 (now MD 144) west of Hancock in far western Washington County. The highway was constructed as a macadam road from US 40 south to Long Hollow Road between 1930 and 1933. MD 453 was extended as a macadam road to Exline Road in 1934 and 1935. The highway was completed to Woodmont in 1938. MD 453 was removed from the state highway system in 1956.

== MD 455 ==
Maryland Route 455
- Location: Delmar
- Existed: 1939–1969

Maryland Route 455 was the designation for Line Road from Delmar east along the Maryland–Delaware state line to MD 353 in northern Wicomico County. The highway was constructed by 1939. MD 455 was replaced with Route 54 in 1969.

== MD 457 ==
Maryland Route 457
- Location: Burrsville–Greensboro
- Existed: 1950–1958

Maryland Route 457 was the designation for Knife Box Road from MD 317 in Burrsville north to MD 313 near Greensboro in northern Caroline County. Knife Box Road was improved in three sections. The first section for 2 miles (3.2 km) south from MD 313 was improved in 1934. That segment was later hard-surfaced in 1942. The second section, from the first section to south of Chapel Creek, was graded in 1944. That section was hard-surfaced in 1950, the same year the third section, from Chapel Creek to Burrsville, was graded. The third section was also hard-surfaced that year and MD 457 was assigned to the whole highway by 1951. MD 457 was removed from the state highway system in 1958.

== MD 465 ==
Maryland Route 465
- Location: Crownsville–Herald Harbor
- Existed: 1933–1969

Maryland Route 465 was the designation for Herald Harbor Road from MD 178 in Crownsville east to River Road in Herald Harbor in central Anne Arundel County. The highway was constructed as a gravel road between 1930 and 1933. MD 465 was removed from the state highway system in 1969.

== MD 467 ==
Maryland Route 467
- Location: Mardela Springs
- Existed: 1939–1969

Maryland Route 467 was the designation for Delmar Road from MD 313 near Mardela Springs east to the Maryland–Delaware state line in northwestern Wicomico County. The part of the highway close to Mardela Springs was paved as part of US 213 (now US 50) by 1927. The remainder of MD 467 was constructed by 1939. MD 467 was replaced with Route 54 in 1969.

== MD 469 ==
Maryland Route 469
- Location: Port Tobacco
- Existed: 1930–1956

Maryland Route 469 was the designation for Chapel Point Road from near Purcell Road north to MD 6 in Port Tobacco in central Charles County. The highway was constructed as a gravel road between 1930 and 1933. MD 469 was removed from the state highway system in 1956.

== MD 473 ==
Maryland Route 473
- Location: Fair Hill
- Length: 1.25 mi (2.01 km)
- Existed: 1933–1958

Maryland Route 473 was the designation for Fairview Road, which ran 1.25 miles (2.01 km) from MD 273 north to Blake Road near Fair Hill in northern Cecil County. The highway was placed under construction in 1930 and was completed as a concrete road by 1933. MD 473 was transferred from state to county maintenance through a May 8, 1958, road transfer agreement.

== MD 474 ==
Maryland Route 474
- Location: Denton, Hobbs
- Existed: 1936–1958

Maryland Route 474 was the designation for two sections of Hobbs Road between Hobbs and Denton in central Caroline County. The first section was constructed as a macadam road by Caroline County with state aid from the Maryland, Delaware & Virginia Railroad just east of the town of Denton along what is now Market Street east to Garland Road by 1910. This county road was improved by the state in 1934. The second section was constructed from Hobbs Road's intersection with the same railroad at Hobbs north to Watts Creek in 1936 and 1937. At that time, both segments were included in the state highway system, with a county-maintained gap. Both sections of Hobbs Road were removed from the state highway system in 1958.

== MD 475 (1933–1946) ==
Maryland Route 475
- Location: Crisfield
- Existed: 1933–c. 1946

Maryland Route 475 was the designation for Jacksonville Road north from MD 413 near Crisfield in southern Somerset County. The highway was constructed by 1933. MD 475 was replaced with a northern extension of MD 358 by 1946.

== MD 475 (1946–1954) ==
Maryland Route 475
- Location: Salisbury
- Existed: c. 1946–1954

Maryland Route 475 was the designation for North Division Street from US 50 (Main Street) north to US 13 (now US 13 Business) within Salisbury. The street was part of US 13 until 1942, when Salisbury Boulevard was completed from Main Street to the north end of Division Street. MD 475 was assigned to North Division Street by 1950. MD 475 was replaced with a northern extension of MD 663 in 1954.

== MD 475 (2001–2009) ==
Maryland Route 475
- Location: Frederick
- Length: 0.26 mi (420 m)
- Existed: 2001–2009

Maryland Route 475 was the designation for the 0.26-mile (0.42 km) section of East Street between South Street and MD 144 (Patrick Street) in Frederick. This four-lane portion of East Street crosses Carroll Creek and provides access to the Frederick terminal station of MARC's Brunswick Line. MD 475 was assigned in 2001. In 2005, construction began to extend East Street south from South Street to an interchange with I-70 and connect with a northward extension of MD 85. MD 475 was transferred to city maintenance after the extension of East Street and the single point urban interchange at I-70 were completed and opened in December 2009.

== MD 476 ==
Maryland Route 476
- Location: Lisbon
- Existed: 1933–1956

Maryland Route 476 was the designation for Morgan Station Road, which ran from MD 144 near Lisbon to a point north of Old Frederick Road in western Howard County. The highway was constructed as a macadam road by 1933. In 1952 and 1953, part of the highway was temporarily a piece of US 40 when Baltimore National Pike (now I-70) was finished east of MD 476 yet under construction to the west. MD 476 was removed from the state highway system in 1956.

== MD 477 ==
Maryland Route 477
- Location: Elkridge
- Existed: 1931–1985

Maryland Route 477 was the designation for Old Washington Road, which ran from US 1 near Montgomery Road south of Elkridge north to US 1 just south of the U.S. Highway's underpass of the Baltimore & Ohio Railroad (now CSX's Capital Subdivision) in Elkridge in eastern Howard County. Almost all of the highway was the original course of the Washington and Baltimore Turnpike in the 19th century and of State Road No. 1, the first major road-building project constructed by the state, between 1906 and 1915. After being heavily damaged by military traffic during World War I, State Road No. 1 was widened from 14 to 20 feet (4.3 to 6.1 m) with concrete shoulders and resurfaced over its entire length in 1918 and 1919. This expansion quickly became obsolete, so between 1928 and 1931, newly designated US 1 was expanded from 20 to 40 feet (6.1 to 12.2 m) over its entire length and relocated to its present alignment through Elkridge. MD 477 was assigned to the old route through the village. MD 477 was removed from the state highway system between 1983 and 1985.

== MD 479 ==
Maryland Route 479
- Location: Cambridge
- Existed: 1935–1999

Maryland Route 479 was the designation for the access road from US 50 to the former Eastern Shore State Hospital in Cambridge. The highway was paved as a macadam road by 1935. MD 479 was transferred from state to private control in 1999.

== MD 484 ==
Maryland Route 484
- Location: Marbury–Pisgah
- Existed: 1933–1989

Maryland Route 484 was the designation for Bicknell Road from MD 224 at Marbury east to MD 425 at Pisgah in western Charles County. The highway had previously also included Poorhouse Road from Pisgah east to MD 6 near Port Tobacco. MD 484 was constructed as a gravel road in two sections from MD 425 at Pisgah east to Ripley Road in 1933 and 1934. A separate piece of the highway was constructed as a gravel road south from MD 224 at Marbury to Sweetman Road in 1935. The Poorhouse Road segment was extended from Ripley Road to a point west of MD 6 in 1939. The Bicknell Road segment was extended from Sweetman Road to MD 425 at Pisgah in 1942. The Poorhouse Road portion of MD 484 was transferred to county control in 1957. The Bicknell Road segment was removed from the state highway system in 1989.

== MD 489 ==
Maryland Route 489
- Location: Whiteleysburg
- Existed: c. 1939–1950

Maryland Route 489 was the designation for Whiteleysburg Road, which ran from MD 314 southeast a very short distance to the Delaware state line in Whiteleysburg in northern Caroline County. The highway was constructed by 1939. MD 489 was removed from the state highway system in 1950. This short stretch of road is now the easternmost part of MD 314.

== MD 491 ==
Maryland Route 491
- Location: Nanjemoy–Ironsides
- Existed: 1933–1956

Maryland Route 491 was the designation for Ironsides Road from MD 6 near Nanjemoy north to MD 6 and MD 425 at Ironsides in western Charles County. The highway was constructed as a gravel road for 1 mile (1.6 km) north from the Nanjemoy end in 1933. MD 491 was extended north to the MD 6–MD 425 intersection at Ironsides in 1950. The highway was replaced by a southern extension of MD 425 in 1956.

== MD 492 ==
Maryland Route 492
- Location: Capitol Heights
- Existed: 1933–1954

Maryland Route 492 was the designation for Maryland Park Drive from the District of Columbia boundary at 63rd Street and Southern Avenue east to MD 214 near Capitol Heights in central Prince George's County. The highway was constructed as a concrete road in 1933. MD 492 was widened with a pair of 5-foot-wide (1.5 m) bituminous shoulders in 1948. The route was removed from the state highway system in 1954.

== MD 498 ==
Maryland Route 498
- Location: Piney Point
- Existed: 1933–1983

Maryland Route 498 was the designation for Lighthouse Road from MD 249 west toward the Piney Point Light at Piney Point in southern St. Mary's County. The highway was constructed as a gravel road in 1933. MD 498 was removed from the state highway system in 1983.

== MD 499 ==
Maryland Route 499
- Location: Maddox
- Existed: 1933–1956

Maryland Route 499 was the designation for Manor Road from MD 238 at Maddox east to near Hurry Road in western St. Mary's County. The highway was constructed as a gravel road in 1933. MD 499 was removed from the state highway system in 1956.
