= Maryland Route 257 =

State highway in Maryland, United States

Maryland Route 257
- Rock Point Road
- Map of Southern Maryland with MD 257 highlighted in red

Route information
- Maintained by MDSHA
- Length: 9.75 mi (15.69 km)
- Existed: 1959–present
- Tourist routes: Religious Freedom Byway

Major junctions
- South end: MD 254 near Rock Point
- North end: US 301 in Newburg

Location
- Country: United States
- State: Maryland
- Counties: Charles

Highway system
- Maryland highway system; Interstate; US; State; Scenic Byways
← MD 256	→ MD 258

Maryland Route 257 (MD 257) is a state highway in the U.S. state of Maryland. Known as Rock Point Road, the state highway runs 9.75 miles (15.69 km) from MD 254 near Rock Point north to U.S. Route 301 (US 301) in Newburg. MD 257 serves the Cobb Neck of southern Charles County between the Potomac River and Wicomico River, connecting the communities of Cobb Island, Issue, Tompkinsville, and Wayside with US 301. The state highway was originally the southernmost section of MD 3, which was constructed on the peninsula in the 1910s. The portion of MD 3 south of US 301 was rebuilt and renumbered as MD 257 in the 1950s. The southern terminus of the route was cut back from Rock Point to its current location in the 1980s.

== Route description ==
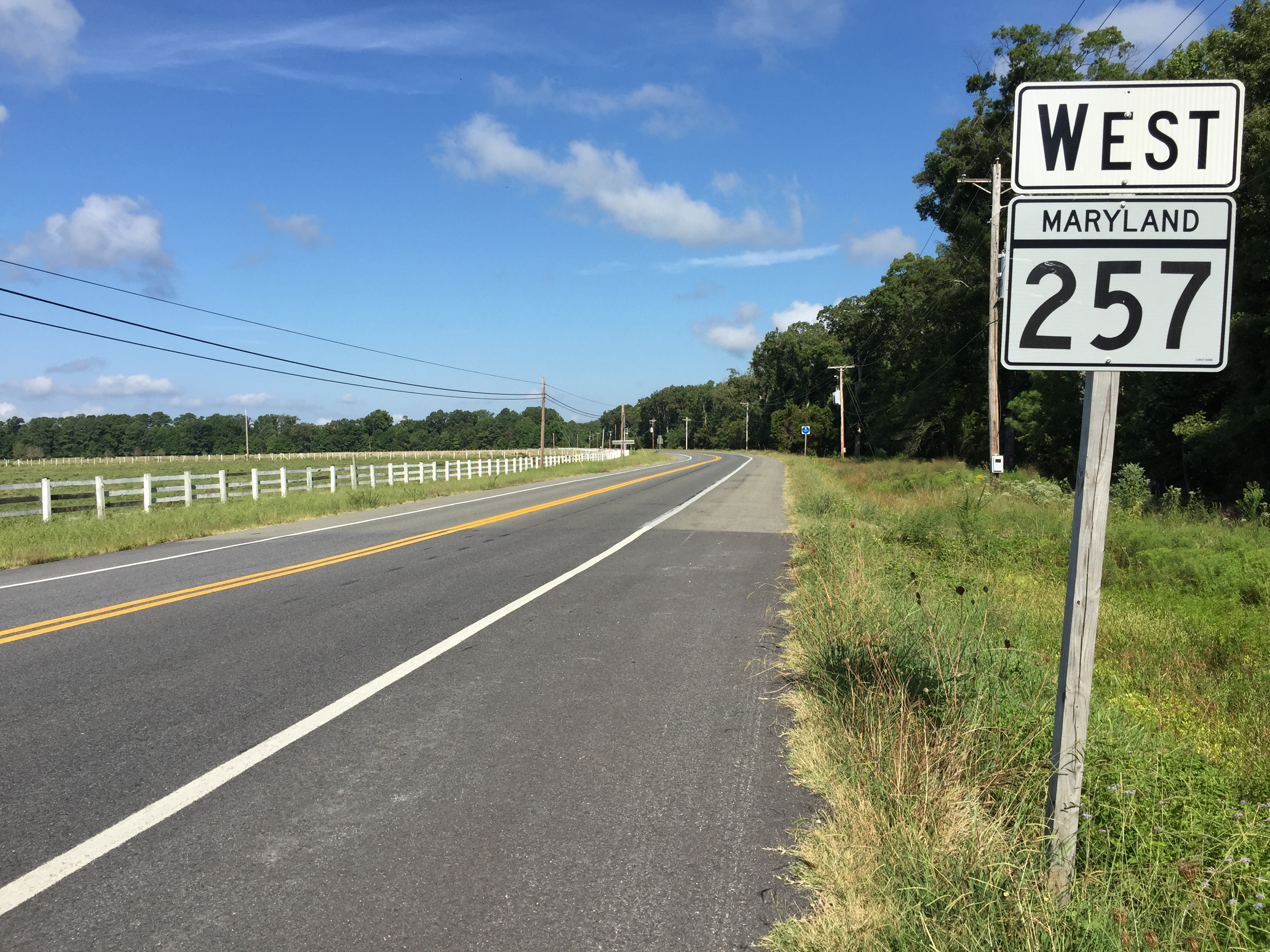
View west at the east end of MD 257 at MD 254 near Rock Point

MD 257 begins at an intersection with the northern end of MD 254 (Cobb Island Road) near Rock Point. Rock Point Road continues southeast as a county highway to the namesake promontory at the confluence of the Wicomico River and Potomac River. MD 257 heads northwest as a two-lane undivided road, passing through the hamlet of Issue, where Swan Point Road splits to the west toward the golf course-centered community of Swan Point. The state highway next passes through Tompkinsville, where the highway passes the southern end of Mount Victoria Road, which serves the village of Mount Victoria. MD 257 next passes through Wayside, where the highway crosses Piccowaxen Creek and intersects Morgantown Road, which leads to the Potomac River community of Morgantown. The state highway continues northwest to Newburg, where the highway meets the north end of Mount Victoria Road. MD 257 curves to the west and crosses over CSX's Pope's Creek Subdivision railroad line, whose southern terminus is at the nearby Morgantown Generating Station, before reaching a directional crossover intersection with US 301 (Robert Crain Highway) a short distance north of the Governor Harry W. Nice Memorial Bridge over the Potomac River.

== History ==
Rock Point Road was the southernmost segment of the highway from Rock Point to Waldorf that was marked for improvement by the Maryland State Roads Commission in 1909. That highway was designated MD 3 in 1927. The Cobb Neck portion of the state road was constructed as a 14-foot (4.3 m) gravel road between Wayside and Tompkinsville in 1913 and a 10-foot (3.0 m) concrete road from Tompkinsville to Rock Point in 1914. The highway was completed when the state road north of Wayside was built as a gravel road by 1919. MD 3 was widened and rebuilt with a bituminous concrete surface from Newburg to Tompkinsville in 1950 and from there to Rock Point in 1951. MD 3 was renumbered as MD 257 in 1959. MD 257 achieved its current length when the highway between MD 254 and Rock Point was transferred to Charles County around 1989.

== Junction list ==
The entire route is in Charles County.

Location	mi	km	Destinations	Notes
Rock Point	0.00	0.00	MD 254 south (Cobb Island Road) / Rock Point Road south – Cobb Island	Southern terminus; northern terminus of MD 254
Newburg	9.75	15.69	US 301 (Robert Crain Highway) – Richmond, Baltimore	Northern terminus
1.000 mi = 1.609 km; 1.000 km = 0.621 mi
