= Maryland Route 255 =

State highway in Maryland, United States

Maryland Route 255
- Maryland Route 255 highlighted in red

Route information
- Maintained by MDSHA
- Length: 4.21 mi (6.78 km)
- Existed: 1927–present

Major junctions
- West end: MD 2 near Owensville
- MD 468 in Galesville
- East end: Riverside Drive in Galesville

Location
- Country: United States
- State: Maryland
- Counties: Anne Arundel

Highway system
- Maryland highway system; Interstate; US; State; Scenic Byways
← MD 254	→ MD 256

Maryland Route 255 (MD 255) is a state highway in the U.S. state of Maryland. The highway runs 4.21 miles (6.78 km) from MD 2 near Owensville east to Riverside Drive in Galesville in Anne Arundel County. MD 255, which was built in the 1920s, originally included the portion of MD 468 between Galesville and Shady Side; the section in Galesville was MD 393. MD 255 and MD 468 were assigned to their present courses in the late 1940s.

== Route description ==
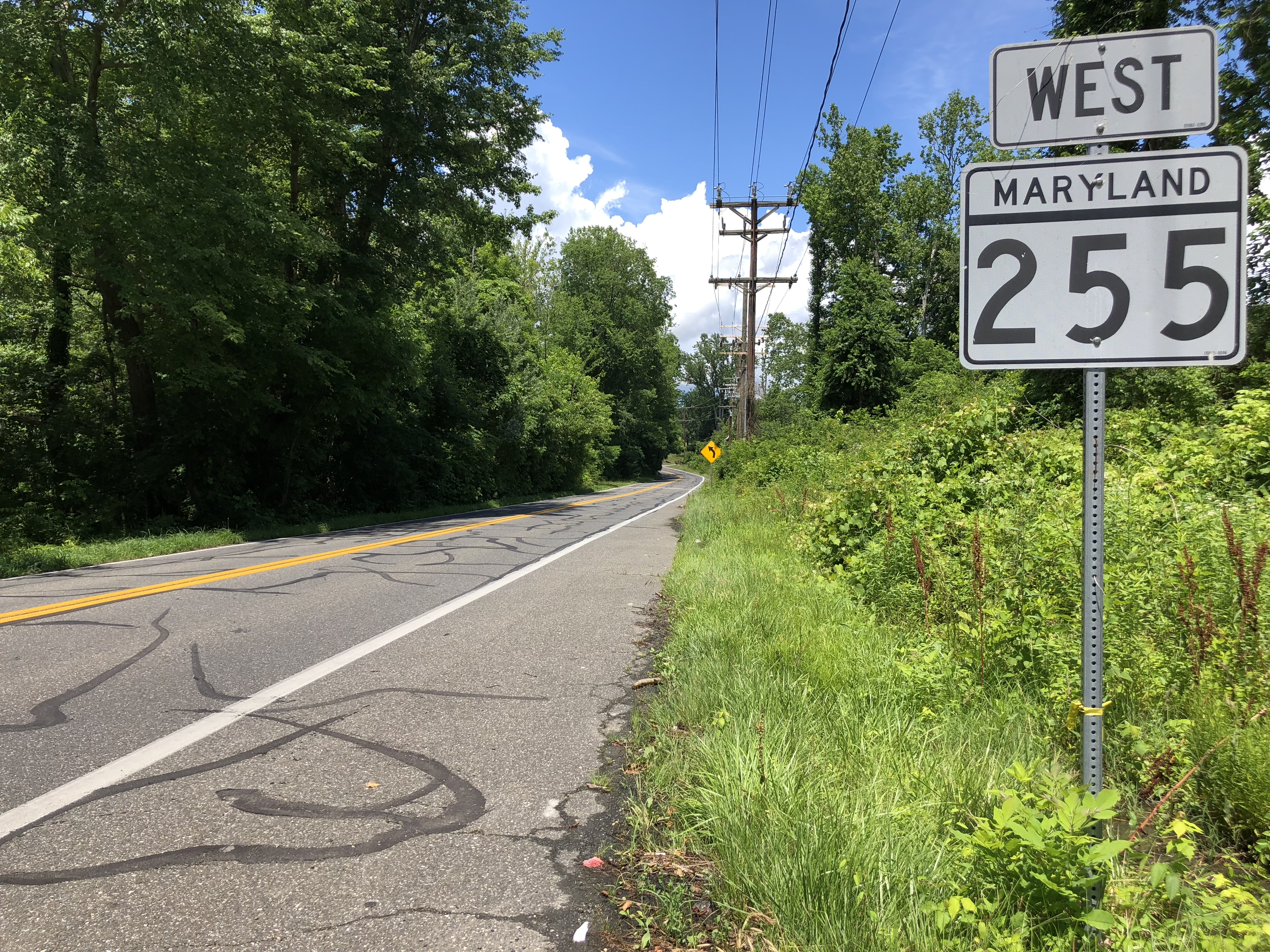
View west along MD 255 at MD 468 in Galesville

MD 255 begins at an intersection with MD 2 (Solomons Island Road) near Owensville, which is also known as West River. The highway heads east as two-lane undivided Owensville Road. The highway enters the Owensville Historic District, within which the highway intersects Owensville Sudley Road and passes southeast of historic Christ Church. MD 255 continues east to an intersection with MD 468 (Muddy Creek Road) adjacent to the Quaker Burying Ground located northeast of the intersection. The highway continues east as Galesville Road into the namesake unincorporated village, where the road passes south of the Carrie Weedon House, the site of the Galesville Heritage Museum. MD 255 carries the name Main Street from Woodfield Road to its eastern terminus at Riverside Drive on the West River.

== History ==
Maryland Route 393
- Location: Galesville
- Existed: 1930–1949

MD 255 originally included Owensville Road and the portion of MD 468 from Galesville to Shadyside. The portion of MD 255 in Galesville was originally MD 393. Grading work began on MD 255 from the Annapolis–Prince Frederick road east to the Quaker Burying Ground and from there south to Sudley Road in 1920. The gravel highway was completed to Sudley Road in 1921 and proposed to extend to Churchton Deale Road, which is today MD 256. The highway extended to Deep Creek Road on the south side of Shady Side in 1923. MD 255 was completed to Shady Side in 1929 and 1930, the same period during which MD 393 was constructed as a gravel road. By 1934, traffic was dense enough that MD 255 was recommended to be widened from 16 to 20 feet (4.9 to 6.1 m) from MD 2 to Shady Side. MD 468 was extended south of Galesville around the West River to Shady Side and MD 255 was extended into Galesville in 1949.

== Junction list ==
The entire route is in Anne Arundel County.

Location	mi	km	Destinations	Notes
Owensville	0.00	0.00	MD 2 (Solomons Island Road) – Annapolis, Prince Frederick	Western terminus
Galesville	3.15	5.07	MD 468 (Muddy Creek Road) – Edgewater, Shady Side	
Galesville	4.21	6.78	Riverside Drive	Eastern terminus
1.000 mi = 1.609 km; 1.000 km = 0.621 mi
