= Maryland Route 254 =

State highway in Maryland, United States

Maryland Route 254
- Cobb Island Road
- Map of Southern Maryland with MD 254 highlighted in red

Route information
- Maintained by MDSHA
- Length: 1.25 mi (2.01 km)
- Existed: 1958–present
- Tourist routes: Religious Freedom Byway

Major junctions
- South end: Cobb Island
- North end: MD 257 near Rock Point

Location
- Country: United States
- State: Maryland
- Counties: Charles

Highway system
- Maryland highway system; Interstate; US; State; Scenic Byways
← MD 253	→ MD 255

Maryland Route 254 (MD 254) is a state highway in the U.S. state of Maryland. Known as Cobb Island Road, the state highway runs 1.25 miles (2.01 km) from Cobb Island north to MD 257 near Rock Point. MD 254 connects the mainland to Cobb Island, which was originally established as a summer resort in the early 1920s, at the southern end of Charles County. The state highway was constructed as Maryland Route 533 in the early 1930s. The state highway was rebuilt and renumbered as MD 254 in the 1950s.

== Route description ==
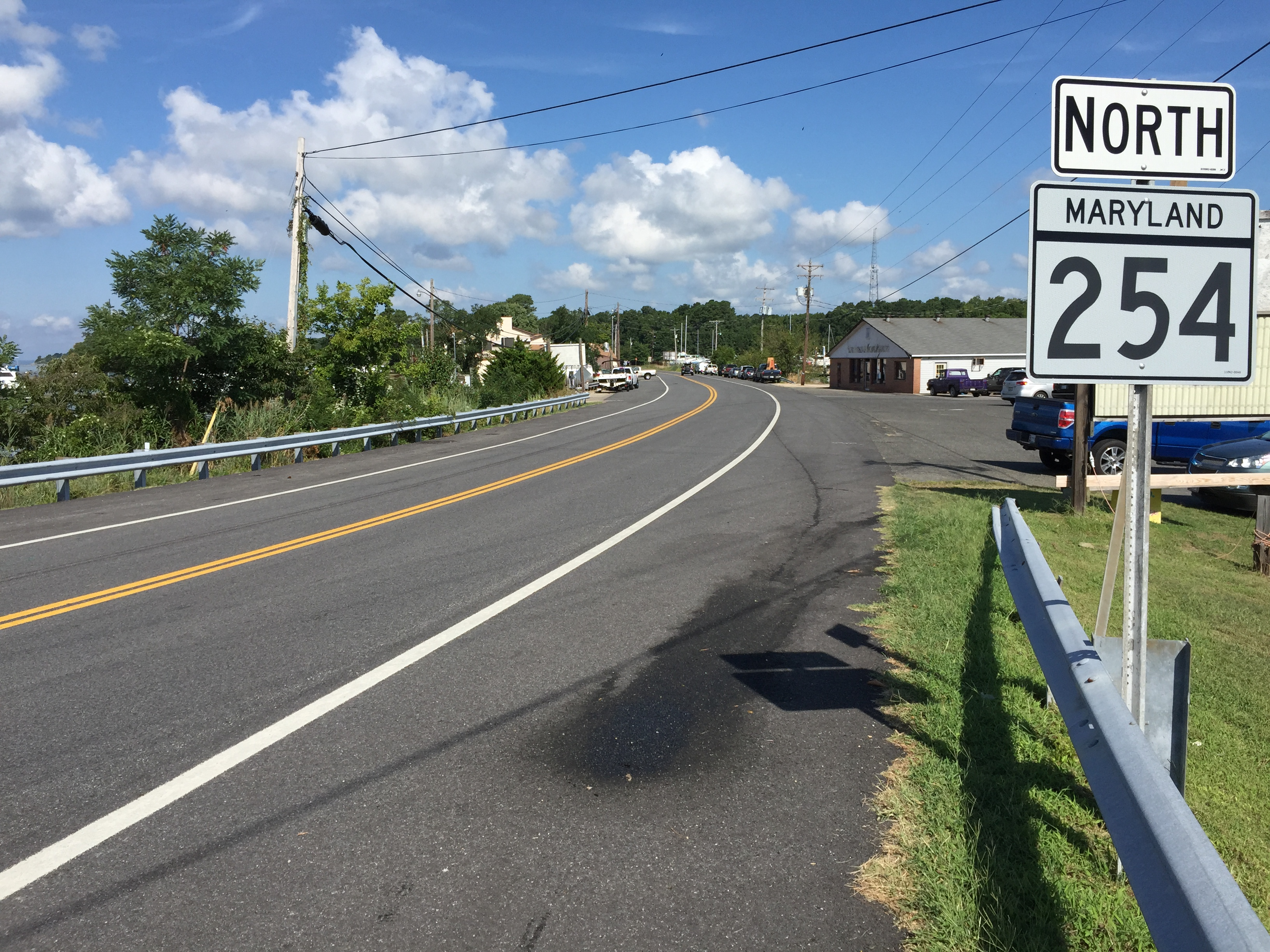
View north along MD 254 just north of the bridge over Neale Sound

MD 254 begins 0.03 miles (0.048 km) south of the intersection of Cobb Island Road and Neale Sound Drive on Cobb Island. Cobb Island Road continues south as a county-maintained two-lane divided avenue to Potomac River Drive on the Potomac River side of the island. North of Neale Sound Drive, MD 254 is a two-lane undivided road and leaves the island by crossing over Neale Sound on the Cobb Island Bridge. The state highway passes between marinas and curves northwest to parallel the coast. At Pine Grove Road, MD 254 veers north to its terminus at Rock Point Road. Rock Point Road heads southeast as a county highway toward Rock Point and northwest as MD 257 up Cobb Neck to U.S. Route 301 in Newburg.

== History ==
Maryland Route 533
- Location: Cobb Island
- Existed: 1932–1958

The original bridge from the mainland to Cobb Island, a "noisy one-way wooden bridge that was prone to summer traffic jams," was constructed in 1923 shortly after the establishment of the island as a summer resort by Robert Crain. In 1932, the Maryland State Roads Commission rebuilt Cobb Island Road as a modern gravel road and replaced the "hazardous" 1923 bridge with a creosoted timber bridge. This bridge was still one-lane, being 10 feet (3.0 m) wide, but had a passing area near the middle. Cobb Island Road was originally designated MD 533. MD 533 was widened to 24 feet (7.3 m) and resurfaced with bituminous stabilized gravel in 1951. MD 533 was renumbered MD 254 in 1958. MD 254 had originally been assigned to Davidsonville Road between Davidsonville and Edgewater in central Anne Arundel County; that highway was renumbered as an eastward extension of MD 214 (Central Avenue) by 1939. A two-lane steel girder Cobb Island Bridge was built in 1963. In 2015, plans were made to construct a new Cobb Island Bridge to replace the existing structure that was structurally deficient. The new Cobb Island Bridge, which includes wider travel lanes, a sidewalk, and lighting, cost $18 million to build and opened to traffic on April 28, 2020.

== Junction list ==
The entire route is in Charles County.

Location	mi	km	Destinations	Notes
Cobb Island	0.00	0.00	Cobb Island Road south	Southern terminus
Neale Sound	0.09– 0.20	0.14– 0.32	Cobb Island Bridge	
Rock Point	1.25	2.01	MD 257 north (Rock Point Road) / Rock Point Road south – Newburg	Northern terminus; southern terminus of MD 257
1.000 mi = 1.609 km; 1.000 km = 0.621 mi
