= Carpenter Point, Charles County, Maryland =

Carpenter Point
- Unincorporated community
- Location within the state of Maryland
- Coordinates: 38°22′46″N 076°54′17″W
- Country: United States
- State: Maryland
- County: Charles
- Time zone: UTC-5 (Eastern (EST))
  - Summer (DST): UTC-4 (EDT)

Carpenter Point is a point of land on the Wicomico River in Charles County, Maryland. It is located on the northern shore of Cobb Neck on the tidal part of the Wicomico River, which was called the West Wicomico River in early colonial records to differentiate it from the Wicomico River on the Eastern Shore of Maryland. The land was originally part of or very near the western border of Captain James Neale's "Wollaston Manor" estate. Cooksey's Point is the next point to the west, and McReynolds Point the next point to the east.
