= Owensville Historic District =

Historic district in Maryland, United States

- U.S. National Register of Historic Places
- U.S. Historic district
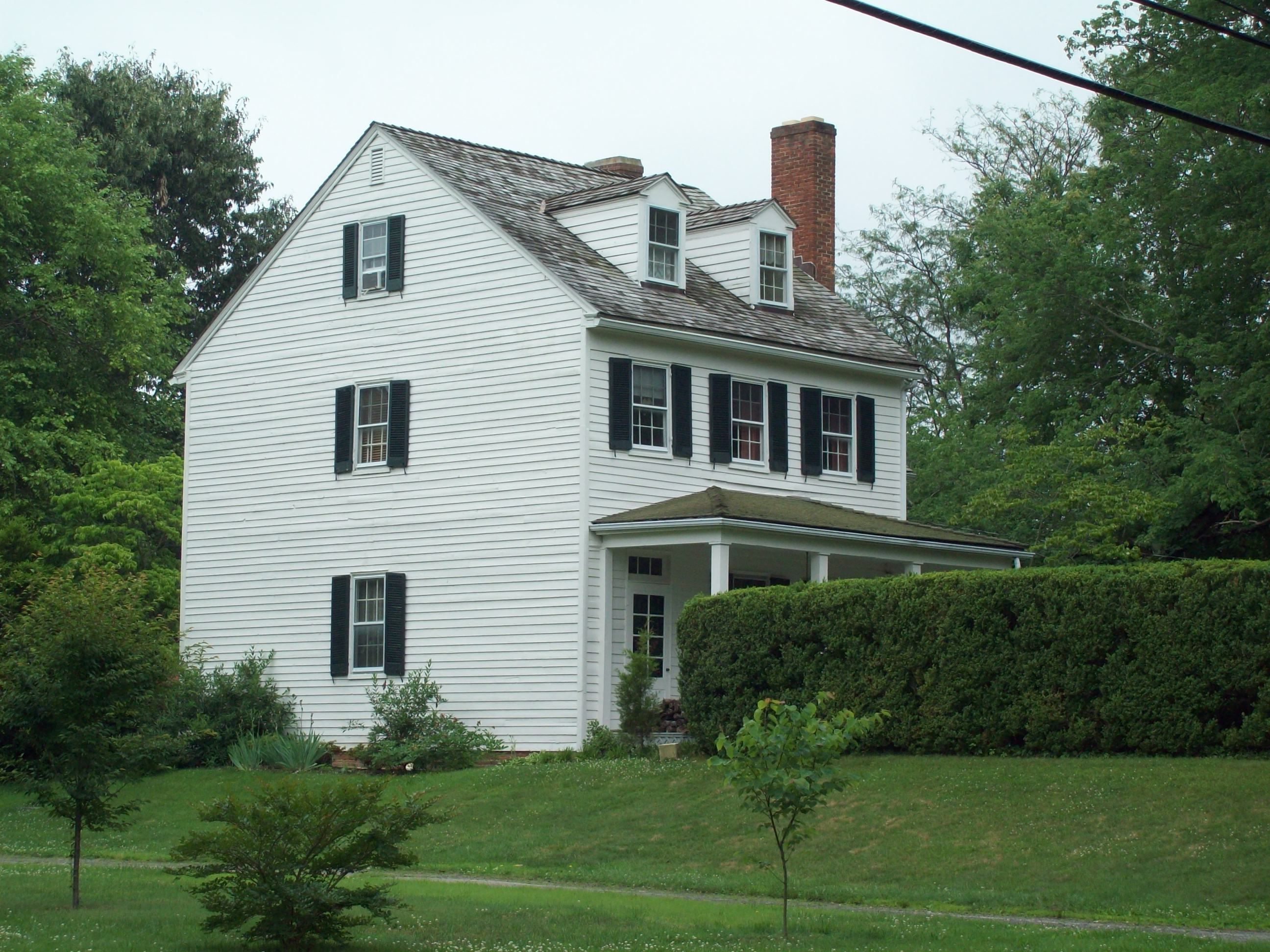
- Home in the Owensville Historic District, May 2010

- Location within Maryland Location within the United States
- Location: Owensville Rd. and Owensville-Sudley Rd., Owensville, Maryland
- Coordinates: 38°51′0″N 76°35′37″W
- Built: 1791
- Architect: Peake, William, Jr.
- Architectural style: Gothic Revival, Italianate
- NRHP reference No.: 03001117
- Added to NRHP: November 08, 2003

Owensville Historic District is a national historic district at Owensville, Anne Arundel County, Maryland. It is located around a small crossroads community located at the intersection of Owensville Road (MD 255) and Owensville-Sudley Road. It consists of a concentration of historic buildings leading up to and clustered around the intersecting roads. It consists of 27 buildings, including two church complexes, 16 dwellings with their associated domestic outbuildings, and several agricultural buildings, including tobacco barns. Included in the district is the separately listed Christ Church. Much of the historic building stock dates between 1825 and 1875.

It was listed on the National Register of Historic Places in 2003.
