= Tompkinsville =

Tompkinsville may refer to:

- Tompkinsville, Kentucky
- Tompkinsville, Maryland
- Tompkinsville, Staten Island, New York
  - Tompkinsville (Staten Island Railway station)
