= Hunters Brooke arson =

2004 arson fire in Maryland, United States

Coordinates: 38.57137°N 77.11372°W

- Subdivision entrance in 2026
- Location: Charles County, Maryland, U.S.
- Date: December 6, 2004
- Target: Hunters Brooke development
- Attack type: Arson
- Perpetrators: Jeremy Parady, Aaron Speed, Patrick Walsh, Roy McCann, and Michael Everhart
- Motive: Anti-black racism (for three of the perpetrators)

The Hunters Brooke arson was a series of fires that destroyed over two dozen houses in the under-construction Hunters Brooke Development on Maryland Route 225, southeast of Indian Head, Maryland, in the United States, on December 6, 2004. It is considered to be the worst arson event in Maryland state history.

== Arsonists, motivation, and legal punishment ==
Initially suspicion fell on environmental extremists, since the development was being constructed in an unusual and sensitive wetland area, a magnolia bog.

However, it was ultimately determined that Patrick Walsh and Aaron Speed, a security guard for the Hunters Brooke Development, recruited three others to set fire to the homes as a hate crime. Three of the arsonists said they were motivated by the fact that the majority of the purchasers were African-Americans.

Convicted and sentenced were:

- Patrick Walsh, age 21, of Fort Washington, Maryland, was sentenced to 235 months in prison followed by 3 years of supervised release in connection with his conviction by a federal jury on September 2, 2005, of conspiracy to commit arson and 35 counts of arson.
- Aaron Speed, age 22, of Waldorf, Maryland, was sentenced to 100 months in prison followed by 3 years of supervised release in connection with his guilty plea on June 23, 2005, to conspiracy to commit arson.
- Jeremy Parady, age 21, of Accokeek, Maryland, was sentenced to 87 months in prison followed by 3 years of supervised release in connection with his guilty plea on April 28, 2005, to conspiracy to commit arson.
- Roy McCann, age 23, of Marbury, Maryland, was sentenced to 46 months in prison followed by 3 years of supervised release in connection with his guilty plea on January 8, 2007, of conspiracy to commit arson and 35 counts of arson.
- Michael Everhart, 21, of Waldorf, Maryland, was sentenced to 44 months in prison followed by 3 years of supervised release in connection with his guilty plea on January 8, 2007, of conspiracy to commit arson and 35 counts of arson.

The trial judge also ordered that each defendant pay restitution of $3,274,538.42.
