= William G. Lewis =

Confederate officer in the American Civil War

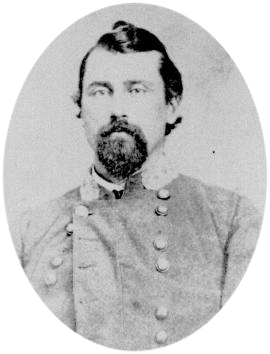
- Born: September 3, 1835; Rocky Mount, North Carolina
- Died: January 7, 1901 (aged 65); Goldsboro, North Carolina
- Burial place: Willow Dale Cemetery; Goldsboro, North Carolina
- Military career
- Allegiance: United States of America; Confederate States of America
- Branch: Confederate States Army Infantry
- Service years: 1861 – 1865
- Rank: Brigadier General
- Conflicts: American Civil War

William Gaston Lewis (September 3, 1835 – January 7, 1901) was a Confederate general in the American Civil War.

== Early life ==
William G. Lewis was born September 3, 1835, in Rocky Mount, North Carolina. He was the son of Dr. John Wesley Lewis and Catherine Ann Battle. His first cousin Anna Lewis married Captain Luther Rice Mills, who later became a college Professor at Wake Forest University. He was educated at Lovejoy's Academy in Raleigh. Soon after the death of his father, the family moved to Chapel Hill, where Lewis entered the University of North Carolina, studying civil engineering. Lewis graduated in 1855.

He then taught in Chapel Hill for a year, before moving to Florida. In 1857, he was appointed to the U. S. Survey Corps, and worked in Minnesota for over a year. He then returned to North Carolina and became assistant engineer on the Wilmington and Weldon Railroad.

== American Civil War ==
When the Civil War began, Lewis joined the Confederate army as the third lieutenant of Company A, 1st North Carolina Regiment ("Bethel"). His first fighting came in the Battle of Big Bethel on June 10, 1861. By January 1862, he had been promoted to major and took part in the Battle of New Bern. For his actions at New Bern, he was promoted to lieutenant colonel of the 33rd North Carolina Infantry. Lewis fought with the regiment at the Seven Days Battle and the Battle of Malvern Hill. During the later months of 1862, he took part in the defense of Richmond.

Lewis returned to North Carolina in December 1862 and took part in the fighting in and around New Bern and Kinston. In the spring of 1863, his regiment returned to Virginia and he took part in the Gettysburg campaign with the 43rd North Carolina Infantry as part of Brigadier General Junius Daniel's Brigade of Major General Robert Rodes' Division. At Gettysburg, the regimental commander, Colonel Thomas S. Kenan, was wounded and captured, and Lewis took command of the regiment.

After the Confederate retreat from Gettysburg, Lewis returned to North Carolina and took positions around New Bern. He subsequently took part in the fighting to recapture Plymouth. He led Robert Hoke's brigade at the Battle of Cold Harbor and was promoted to brigadier general following the battle in June 1864. He was then wounded during Jubal Early's raid on Washington. In 1864, he married Martha Lucinda "Mittie" Pender, first cousin of Major General Dorsey Pender. Lewis also supervised the entrenchment of Drewry's Bluff, Virginia. He took part in a skirmish near Farmville, Virginia, on April 7, 1865, but was once again wounded and captured during the fighting. He was paroled within two weeks. Throughout his military service in the Confederate Army, Lewis saw action in 37 battles and skirmishes.

== Postwar career ==
Following the war, Lewis returned to his peacetime career as a civil engineer, serving as the State Engineer of North Carolina for thirteen years, plus many years as road-master, construction engineer, chief engineer, and general superintendent for several railroads. In 1899, he was chief engineer for the Albany and Raleigh Railroad.

Lewis died on January 7, 1901, from pneumonia.

== Ancestry ==
Through his paternal Grandmother Ann Harrison, he is descended from early immigrant Captain James Neale and his wife Anne Gill, who was a Lady-in-Waiting to Queen Henrietta Maria (the wife of King Charles I of England).

Ancestors of William G. Lewis

16. Richard Lewis
8. Exum Lewis Sr.
4. Exum Lewis Jr.
18. Bartholomew Figures Jr.
9. Elizabeth Figures
2. John Wesley Lewis
20. William Harrison
10. Kenelm Harrison
21. Winifred Smoot
5. Ann Harrison
22. Richard Edelin
11. Elizabeth Edlin
23. Margaret Neale
1. General William Gaston Lewis
24. Elisha Battle
12. William B. Battle
25. Elizabeth Ruth Sumner
6. Joel Battle
26. Henry Horn
13. Charity Horn
27. Anne Purcell
3. Catherine Battle
28. Jacob Johnston
14. Amos Johnston
29. Mary Wallers
7. Mary Palmer Johnston
30. John Williams
15. Dorcas Williams
31. Dorcas ---

== See also ==
- List of American Civil War Generals (Confederate)

== Sources ==
- Eicher, John H., and David J. Eicher, Civil War High Commands. Stanford: Stanford University Press, 2001. ISBN 978-0-8047-3641-1.
- Sifakis, Stewart. Who Was Who in the Civil War. New York: Facts On File, 1988. ISBN 978-0-8160-1055-4.
- Warner, Ezra J. (1959). Generals in Gray: Lives of the Confederate Commanders (1st ed.). Baton Rouge: Louisiana State University Press. OCLC 445052.
- William Gaston Lewis
- Inventory of the William Gaston Lewis Papers, Manuscripts Department, UNC Library
