= Evergreen (Owensville, Maryland) =

Historic house in Maryland, United States

- U.S. National Register of Historic Places
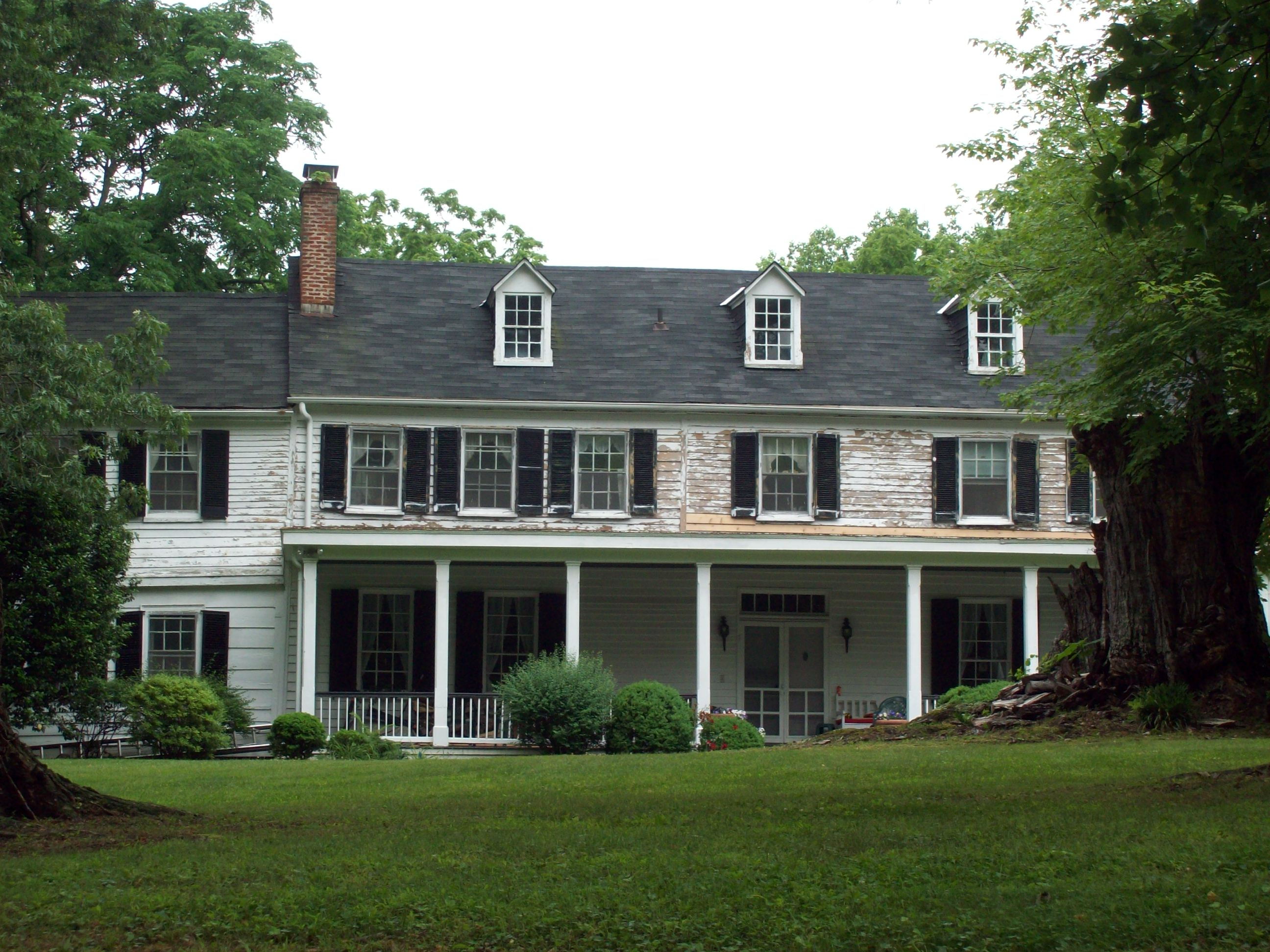
- Evergreen, May 2010

- Location within Maryland Location within the United States
- Nearest city: Owensville, Maryland
- Coordinates: 38°50′02″N 76°35′16″W
- Built: 1853
- Architectural style: Colonial, Federal
- NRHP reference No.: 69000066
- Added to NRHP: May 15, 1969

Evergreen is a historic home at Owensville, Anne Arundel County, Maryland, United States. It is a 2 1/2-story white frame house composed of several sections, the earliest of which was built about 1760, and constructed by George Neall in the Federal style. The house reflects building evolution from the third quarter of the 18th century to the late 19th century.

Evergreen was listed on the National Register of Historic Places in 1969.
