= Rock Point, Maryland =

- Census-designated place
- Location within the state of Maryland Rock Point (the United States)
- Coordinates: 38°16′19″N 76°50′27″W
- Country: United States
- State: Maryland
- County: Charles

Area
  - Total: 0.63 sq mi (1.63 km^{2})
  - Land: 0.63 sq mi (1.63 km^{2})
  - Water: 0 sq mi (0.00 km^{2})

Population (2020)
  - Total: 82
  - Density: 130.4/sq mi (50.34/km^{2})
- Time zone: UTC−5 (Eastern (EST))
  - Summer (DST): UTC−4 (EDT)
- ZIP code: 20664
- Area codes: 240 and 301
- FIPS code: 24-67500
- GNIS feature ID: 591157

Rock Point is an unincorporated community and census-designated place in Charles County, Maryland, United States.

== Description ==
Rock Point is located near Cobb Island at the mouth of the Wicomico River. As of the 2010 census, it had a population of 107.

Rock Point was named for the rockfish, or striped bass. Today Rock Point is largely a vacation land, but in the early 20th century, Rock Point had a large hotel serving summer vacationers and winter duck hunters, a steamboat wharf and warehouse, and a sizable general store. Fish were caught by a net hauled between two boats at some distance from each other, a method then called "Hauling Seine". Rock Point also had an oyster shucking and packing plant, which served as a crab steaming and picking plant during the summer months, enabling the shipment of finfish, oysters and crabs in season to restaurants in Washington, D.C., and Baltimore.

General Billy Mitchell, a duck hunter, was a regular patron during these early years. Earlier, Rock Point had become a center of Confederate activity, and was occupied by 300 Union troops throughout the Civil War. Columbus Lancaster, who owned the old general store, was arrested and put in the Old Capitol Prison in Washington on suspicion of collaborating with the Confederates. Rock Hall is the ancestral home of the Lancaster family, and was originally the 490-acre (2.0 km^{2}) dowry of Elizabeth Neale at her wedding to John Lancaster in 1731. As of 2009, this home has been owned by the same family since it was granted to James Neale in 1641, as part of Wolleston Manor.

"Charleston" was an 800-acre (3.2 km^{2}) plantation, worked by 100 slaves, on Charleston Creek, north of Rock Point. The plantation was part of Wolleston Manor. Its owner in the early 19th century was Daniel Jenifer, a minister to Austria and a member of the United States Congress. Henry Clay and Daniel Webster were among the many prominent guests whom Jenifer entertained at Wolleston Manor.

== Demographics ==
Historical population
Census	Pop.	Note	%±
2010	107		—
2020	82		−23.4%
U.S. Decennial Census; 2010 2020

Rock Point first appeared as a census designated place in the 2010 U.S. census.

=== 2020 census ===
Rock Point CDP, Maryland – Racial and ethnic composition Note: the US Census treats Hispanic/Latino as an ethnic category. This table excludes Latinos from the racial categories and assigns them to a separate category. Hispanics/Latinos may be of any race.
Race / Ethnicity (NH = Non-Hispanic)	Pop 2010	Pop 2020	% 2010	% 2020
White alone (NH)	88	71	82.24%	86.59%
Black or African American alone (NH)	8	5	7.48%	6.10%
Native American or Alaska Native alone (NH)	0	1	0.00%	1.22%
Asian alone (NH)	2	3	1.87%	3.66%
Native Hawaiian or Pacific Islander alone (NH)	0	0	0.00%	0.00%
Other race alone (NH)	0	0	0.00%	0.00%
Mixed race or Multiracial (NH)	6	1	5.61%	1.22%
Hispanic or Latino (any race)	3	1	2.80%	1.22%
Total	107	82	100.00%	100.00%

== Notable person ==
- William Colby, former Director of Central Intelligence
