= Glymont, Maryland =

Unincorporated community in Maryland, United States

- Unincorporated community
- Interactive map of Glymont, Maryland
- Coordinates: 38°36′04.4″N 77°08′37.9″W
- Country: Country
- United States: State
- Maryland: County

Glymont is an unincorporated community in Charles County, Maryland, United States.

== Geography ==
Glymont is located at 38°36′04.4″N 77°08′37.9″W (38.6012297, -77.1438678). It lies 26 feet (7.9 m) above sea level.

== Nearby cities ==
- Perry Wright 0.5 mi. SW
- Potomac Heights 0.5 mi. N
- Indian Head 1 mi. W
- Occoquan (Prince William County, Virginia) 8.5 mi. NW
- Port Tobacco 9.1 mi. SE
- Quantico (Prince William County, Virginia) 9.8 mi. SW

== Nearby cemeteries ==
- Saint Charles 0.5 mi. E
- Park Hill 1.8 mi. SW
- Marbury 2.3 mi. S
- Pleasant Grove 3.2 mi. SW
- Saint Johns 3.6 mi. E
- Metropolitan 3.8 mi. E
- Pisgah 4.2 mi. S
- Macedonia 4.8 mi. NE
- Smith Chapel 5 mi. S
- Shiloh 5.2 mi. NE
- Alexandria 5.4 mi. SW
- Fairfax Grave (Fairfax County, Virginia) 5.5 mi. N
