= Malcolm, Maryland =

Unincorporated community in Maryland, United States

- Unincorporated community
- Location within the state of Maryland Malcolm (the United States)
- Coordinates: 38°37′00″N 76°47′13″W
- Country: United States
- State: Maryland
- County: Charles
- Time zone: UTC-5 (Eastern (EST))
  - Summer (DST): UTC-4 (EDT)
- ZIP code: 20601
- Area code: 301

Malcolm is an unincorporated community, essentially centered on a five-way intersection in Charles County, Maryland, United States, located approximately seven miles (11 km) east of Waldorf. Horsehead Road, one of the five roads meeting here, was the route traveled by John Wilkes Booth to Dr. Mudd's house after Booth's assassination of Abraham Lincoln. Malcolm is known locally by the deprecated name "Dogpatch." Malcolm Elementary School, named for the Malcolm community, is a primary school located there. It is a certified Blue Ribbon school according to the Charles County Board of Education. It sits in a rural area of the community, slightly west of the Patuxent river.

Malcolm is located at 38°37′0″N 76°47′13″W (38.616667, -76.786944).
