= Newburg, Maryland =

Unincorporated community in Maryland, United States

- Unincorporated community
- Location in Maryland Newburg (the United States)
- Coordinates: 38°22′38″N 76°57′12″W
- Country: United States
- State: Maryland
- County: Charles
- Time zone: UTC-5 (Eastern (EST))
  - Summer (DST): UTC-4 (EDT)
- ZIP code: 20664
- Area codes: 240 and 301

Newburg is an unincorporated community in Charles County, Maryland, United States. Newburg has two stores, a lodge hall, and a fire department, as well as Piccowaxen Middle School and Dr. Thomas L. Higdon Elementary, both serving the entire Cobb Neck peninsula (i.e. all along MD 257 to Cobb Island). Newburg also is the northbound terminus of the Harry Nice Memorial Bridge serving U.S. Route 301.

== Notable people ==
- Danny Gatton, guitarist
- Charles Lollar, Republican politician
- Allyn Rose, American beauty pageant titleholder and activist
