= William J. Frere =

American politician

William Joseph Frere (July 1, 1861; Washingston, D.C. – October 6, 1922; Tompkinsville, Maryland) was an American farmer and politician, serving as a state senator in Maryland. A member of the Democratic Party, Frere represented Charles County, Maryland from 1910 to 1914. Frere lived in Tompkinsville and was a farmer. He was a sponsor of the failed Digges Amendment, which was intended to disenfranchise African-American voters by challenging the Fifteenth Amendment's applicability to state elections, and also to enforce a property requirement. It was strongly defeated in a public referendum.
