= Magnolia bog =

Type of rare wetland ecosystem

A magnolia bog is a rare form of wetland ecosystem found primarily in the Washington metropolitan area in the United States. Officially named in the early 1900s by ecologist Waldo Lee McAtee, magnolia bogs get their name from the abundance of sweetbay magnolias that grow within them.

Once common, these bogs have begun to disappear due to the high levels of development in their natural area. Currently, it is believed that there are less than two dozen remaining magnolia bogs worldwide. Largely due to this scarcity, a large number of the species found in magnolia bogs are rare, threatened, or endangered.

== Location ==
Magnolia bogs are not actual bogs but are instead seeps, which form when uphill groundwater hits a layer of clay, causing it to “seep” out of the ground. Magnolia bogs are primarily found in the Washington metropolitan area. They can be found along a fall line spanning from Prince George's County, MD to Fredericksburg, VA. Most bogs are very small, usually only an acre or less in size.

Suitland Bog is located in Suitland, MD. It has been affected by the introduction of non-native pitcher plants, as well as construction of a sewer line and nearby housing developments. It is one of the few remaining magnolia bogs.

== Species ==
A magnolia bog is home to many species, and with the support of volunteers and county staff who are taking steps to improve and preserve the ecosystem, more and more species are returning as well. Some of the species include gray fox, wood frog, spring peeper frog, wood satyr butterfly, swamp white oak, mountain laurel, cinnamon fern, wild raisin, and the northern pitcher plant.

== Purposes ==
Magnolia bogs serve to provide habitat and protection for many species. These species include a variety of organisms ranging from plants, amphibians, insects, and mammals. Magnolia bogs are unique ecosystems that are protected by the outside environment in order to allow the bog and the species living inside of the bog to thrive and rebuild.
