= Freeland, Maryland =

Unincorporated community in Maryland, United States

- Unincorporated community
- Location within the State of Maryland Freeland, Maryland (the United States)
- Coordinates: 39°42′17″N 76°41′02″W
- Country: United States
- State: Maryland
- County: Baltimore
- Time zone: UTC-5 (Eastern (EST))
  - Summer (DST): UTC-4 (EDT)
- ZIP code: 21053
- Area codes: 410, 443 and 667

Freeland is an unincorporated community in Baltimore County, Maryland, United States.
