= Ironsides, Maryland =

Unincorporated community in Maryland, United States

- Unincorporated community
- Location within the state of Maryland Ironsides (the United States)
- Coordinates: 38°29′30″N 77°9′35″W
- Country: United States
- State: Maryland
- County: Charles
- Elevation: 126 ft (38 m)
- Time zone: UTC-5 (Eastern (EST))
  - Summer (DST): UTC-4 (EDT)
- GNIS feature ID: 588681

Ironsides is an unincorporated community or "post village" in Charles County, Maryland, United States with zip code 20643. The Post Office was established in 1897 and remained open until at least 1976. Today Ironsides area residents have Indian Head or Nanjemoy addresses. The nearby historic post offices of Nanjemoy and Doncaster, dating from 1800 and 1855, are often associated with historical records of Ironsides.

== Geography ==
The community lies at an elevation of 126 feet (38 m).

== Etymology ==
The origin of the name of the town is unclear; it is either a reference to the Frigate USS Constitution, known as "Old Ironsides", or to iron siding on a house renovated there in 1886.

== History ==
Nearby, Old Durham Church (est. 1692) is a local landmark; originally a log structure, it was replaced with brick in 1732 and renovated in 1791. Revolutionary War General William Smallwood and colonial Governor William Stone are buried there. Smallwood was elected vestryman at Old Durham Church in 1788, and built a road from his home at Mattawoman Plantation in modern Rison, to the church. "Smallwood Church Road" today is a paved two-lane road running from Rison to Ironsides. During the colonial period, the Ironsides area was divided up into small farms with colorful names: Ward's Delight, Ward's Addition, Wards Trouble, Ingerthorpe/ Ingerstone/ Angerstone/ Ingolthorpe (variously spelled), Charlestowne, Ragged Chance, Randolphs Addition, Senas Delight, Dembar Addition, the Land Resurveyed, Franklins Beginning, Expectation, and Moles Adventure.

The most prominent public buildings in Ironsides today are the tiny Ironsides Store, the Ironsides Volunteer Rescue Squad Company 58, and the historical Church of the Lord Jesus Christ. In 1966, the Ironsides Rescue Squad Inc. was declared by the State of Maryland to be in forfeiture for payment of taxes or filing an annual report. The town is at the crossroads of state routes 6 (Port Tobacco Road) and 425. Route 425 is called Ironsides Road south of Ironsides, and Mason Springs Road to the north. This latter section of road, running to Pisgah, was known as the "Johnnie Cake Road" in 1918. The concrete arch bridge on Route 6 over nearby Wards Run was built in 1929 and rehabilitated in 1987. The town is along Maryland Scenic Byways Number 16, the Religious Freedom Byway, on the way to Durham Church. The Charles County Genealogical Society Cemetery Transcription Project has inventoried the Gray family cemetery at Mansion Hall in Ironsides, which is a ruin dating from 1700 at a site called "The Mistake", which consisted of 227 acres (0.92 km^{2}) in 1732.

In 1914, a wealthy retired stockbroker, Thomas W. Poole, made the news when he committed suicide at his estate in Ironsides.

In 1948, Maryland became the twenty-first state to join the "American Tree Farm" movement, with the dedication of a 1,278-acre tract of forest owned by the Glatfelter Pulpwood Company, still a major landholder in the Ironsides area.

In 1953, a 27-year-old volcanologist who grew up in Ironsides, Rolf Werner Juhle, vanished in the "Valley of Ten Thousand Smokes", Katmai National Monument, Alaska. His body was never found. Dr. Juhle's family owned a tobacco and cattle farm in Ironsides.
