= Herald Harbor, Maryland =

- Census-designated place
- Location of Herald Harbor, Maryland
- Coordinates: 39°3′5″N 76°34′30″W
- Country: United States
- State: Maryland
- County: Anne Arundel

Area
  - Total: 2.46 sq mi (6.36 km^{2})
  - Land: 1.68 sq mi (4.35 km^{2})
  - Water: 0.78 sq mi (2.01 km^{2})
- Elevation: 52 ft (16 m)

Population (2020)
  - Total: 2,869
  - Density: 1,709.0/sq mi (659.84/km^{2})
- Time zone: UTC−5 (Eastern (EST))
  - Summer (DST): UTC−4 (EDT)
- ZIP code: 21032
- Area codes: 410 and 443 and 667
- FIPS code: 24-38025
- GNIS feature ID: 0590448

Herald Harbor is a census-designated place and an unincorporated community in Anne Arundel County, Maryland, United States. As of the 2010 census, the population was 2,603. It is a quiet residential area with a scenic view of the Severn River and is near the community of Crownsville and Interstate 97. Herald Harbor is known for its area immediately along the Severn River known as Long Point on the Severn, a fairly affluent neighborhood composed mainly of retired and wealthy land owners.

== Geography ==
Herald Harbor is located at 39°3′5″N 76°34′30″W (39.051260, −76.574960).

According to the United States Census Bureau, the CDP has a total area of 2.4 square miles (6.3 km^{2}), of which 1.7 square miles (4.4 km^{2}) is land and 0.77 square miles (2.0 km^{2}), or 31.31%, is water, consisting of the tidal Severn River.

The name "Herald Harbor" is originally derived from a Washington, D.C. newspaper, the Washington Herald, which promoted its subscriptions by giving away small plots of land in the area for summer homes.

== Demographics ==
Historical population
Census	Pop.	Note	%±
2000	2,313		—
2010	2,603		12.5%
2020	2,869		10.2%
U.S. Decennial Census

=== 2020 census ===
As of the 2020 census, Herald Harbor had a population of 2,869. The median age was 44.1 years. 20.4% of residents were under the age of 18 and 16.9% of residents were 65 years of age or older. For every 100 females there were 103.2 males, and for every 100 females age 18 and over there were 101.1 males age 18 and over.

100.0% of residents lived in urban areas, while 0.0% lived in rural areas.

There were 1,141 households in Herald Harbor, of which 28.5% had children under the age of 18 living in them. Of all households, 59.1% were married-couple households, 16.1% were households with a male householder and no spouse or partner present, and 17.9% were households with a female householder and no spouse or partner present. About 21.4% of all households were made up of individuals and 7.9% had someone living alone who was 65 years of age or older.

There were 1,223 housing units, of which 6.7% were vacant. The homeowner vacancy rate was 1.8% and the rental vacancy rate was 0.0%.

Racial composition as of the 2020 census
Race	Number	Percent
White	2,473	86.2%
Black or African American	45	1.6%
American Indian and Alaska Native	3	0.1%
Asian	48	1.7%
Native Hawaiian and Other Pacific Islander	2	0.1%
Some other race	37	1.3%
Two or more races	261	9.1%
Hispanic or Latino (of any race)	104	3.6%

=== 2000 census ===
As of the 2000 census, there were 2,313 people, 941 households, and 641 families residing in the CDP. The population density was 1,373.0 inhabitants per square mile (530.1/km^{2}). There were 1,022 housing units at an average density of 606.6 per square mile (234.2/km^{2}). The racial makeup of the CDP was 96.97% White, 0.65% African American, 0.30% Native American, 0.82% Asian, 0.04% Pacific Islander, 0.17% from other races, and 1.04% from two or more races. Hispanic or Latino of any race were 1.25% of the population.

There were 941 households, out of which 28.6% had children under the age of 18 living with them, 58.8% were married couples living together, 6.3% had a female householder with no husband present, and 31.8% were non-families. 22.0% of all households were made up of individuals, and 4.3% had someone living alone who was 65 years of age or older. The average household size was 2.46 and the average family size was 2.90.

In the CDP, the population was spread out, with 21.1% under the age of 18, 6.1% from 18 to 24, 34.5% from 25 to 44, 30.3% from 45 to 64, and 8.0% who were 65 years of age or older. The median age was 39 years. For every 100 females, there were 105.6 males. For every 100 females age 18 and over, there were 101.8 males.

The median income for a household in the CDP was $73,893, and the median income for a family was $83,812. Males had a median income of $55,000 versus $28,684 for females. The per capita income for the CDP was $34,189. About 4.1% of families and 5.9% of the population were below the poverty line, including 10.3% of those under age 18 and none of those age 65 or over.
