= Tompkinsville, Maryland =

Coordinates: 38°19′18″N 76°53′33″W

Tompkinsville is a populated place in Charles County, Maryland. It was the site of a post office. William J. Frere lived there.
