= James Neale =

English emigrant to Maryland (1615–1684)

- Born: c. 1615; London, England
- Died: March 29, 1684 (aged 68–69); Charles County, Maryland, British America
- Spouse: Anne Gill
- Children: 5
- Military career
- Allegiance: Maryland Colonial Militia
- Rank: Captain

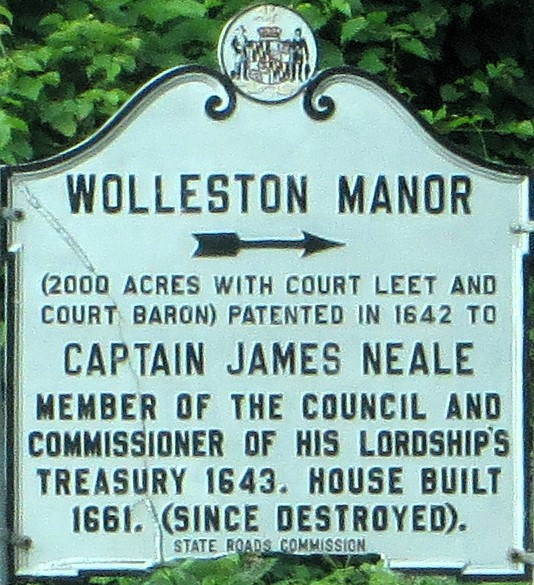
Wolleston Manor sign

Captain James Neale (1615 – March 29, 1684) was an influential early immigrant to Maryland.

== Early life ==
Neale was born in 1615, to Jane Baker and Raphael Neale of Drury Lane, London and of Wollaston, Northamptonshire, England. One of his daughters was Henrietta Maria Neale, who married Richard Bennett Jr., son of Governor Richard Bennett of Virginia.

== Career ==
Neale immigrated to the Province of Maryland in about 1636 or 1637. He was 21 years old. On June 19, 1641, Neale received 1000 acres (4 km^{2}) of land for having transported himself and five servants to Maryland. He assigned these acres to Thomas Hebden.

In a warrant dated July 25, 1641 in London from Lord Baltimore, Neale was granted another 2000 acres (8 km^{2}) on October 31, 1642 for a manor which would be called Wollaston. The manor would prove to be the principal seat of the Neale family for several generations and was situated in what would later be called Charles County, Maryland.

Neale was a member of the Maryland Council in 1643 and again in 1644. In 1644, Neale aided Thomas Cornwallis in arresting accused pirate Richard Ingle for anti-royal behaviors. However, both Neale and Cornwallis set Captain Ingle free and were only fined and suspended.

By 1647 he had returned to England leaving his father-in-law, Benjamin Gill, as his attorney and representative in Maryland. During his absence from Maryland he resided in Spain and Portugal, where he engaged in commerce, and was also employed in various affairs by the King and the Duke of York.

In 1660 he was an agent of Lord Baltimore at Amsterdam to protest against the settlement of Dutch upon the Delaware. On January 9, 1659/60 Lord Baltimore issued a special order, reciting that whereas Neale, formerly an inhabitant of Maryland, has been absent from the province for some years, and now desires to return with his family there to reside and inhabit, he has full leave to do so as also to possess such lands as he has a right to, and to enter and trade freely in any port in Maryland. Neale died in 1684, leaving a will dated November 27, 1683 and proved March 29, 1684.

== Personal life ==
Coat of Arms of James Neale

He married Anne Gill, daughter of Benjamin Gill, Gentleman, and Mary Mainwaring (a descendant of Thomas Stanley, King of Mann). Anne Gill served as a lady-in-waiting to Queen Henrietta Maria, wife of King Charles I.

Their children included:

- Henrietta Marie (named after Queen Henrietta Maria)
- James Neale II (he married Elizabeth Lord, daughter of Captain John Lord who was a magistrate in Westmoreland County, Virginia)
- Dorothy Neale
- Anthony Neale
- Jane Neale

== Legacy ==
Many of Neale's descendants became Jesuit priests, including Bennett Neale, Archbishop Leonard Neale, Francis Neale, Charles Neale, and William Matthews. One of his descendants, William Gaston Lewis, became a Confederate General in the Civil War.
