= Charles County, Maryland =

County in Maryland, United States

- County
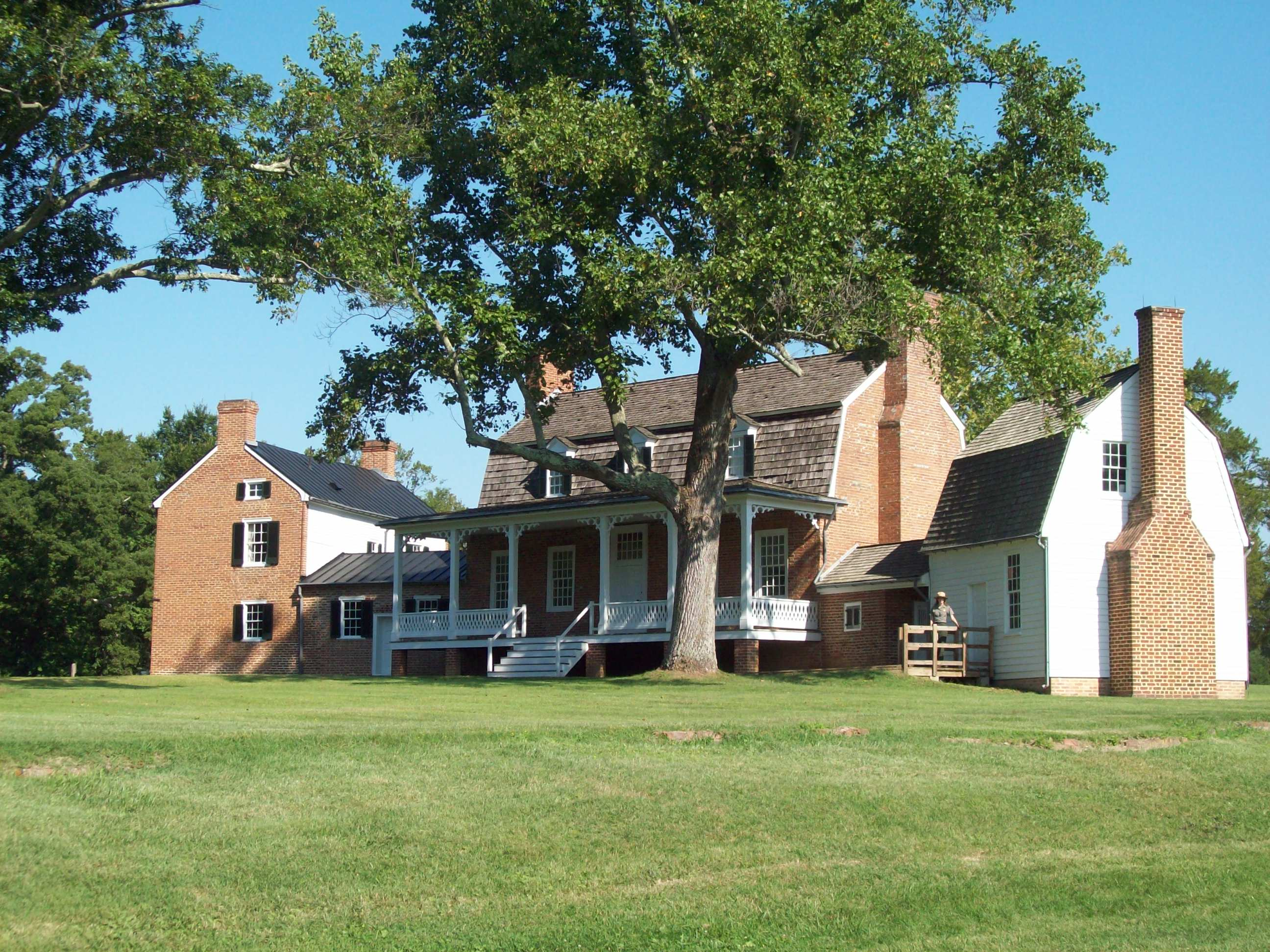
- Thomas Stone House

- Flag Seal

- Location within the U.S. state of Maryland
- Coordinates: 38°29′N 77°01′W
- Country: United States
- State: Maryland
- Founded: April 13, 1658
- Named for: Charles Calvert, 3rd Baron Baltimore
- Seat: La Plata
- Largest community: Waldorf

Area
  - Total: 643 sq mi (1,670 km^{2})
  - Land: 458 sq mi (1,190 km^{2})
  - Water: 185 sq mi (480 km^{2}) 29%

Population (2020)
  - Total: 166,617
  - Estimate (2025): 176,593 ▲
  - Density: 363.79/sq mi (140.46/km^{2})
- Time zone: UTC−5 (Eastern)
  - Summer (DST): UTC−4 (EDT)
- Congressional district: 5th
- Website: www.charlescountymd.gov

Charles County is located in the U.S. state of Maryland. As of the 2020 United States census, the population was 166,617. The county seat is La Plata. The county was named for Charles Calvert (1637–1715), third Baron Baltimore. The county is part of the Southern Maryland region of the state. With a median household income of $103,678, Charles County is the 39th-wealthiest county in the United States as of 2020, and the highest-income county in the United States with a Black-majority population.

== History ==
Charles County was created in 1658 by an Order in Council. There was also an earlier Charles County from 1650 to 1654, sometimes referred to in historic documents as Old Charles County, which consisted largely of lands within today's borders but "included parts of St. Mary's, Calvert, present-day Charles, and Prince George's County". John Tayloe I purchased land around Nanjemoy Creek after 1710 from which to mine iron and ship to his furnaces at Bristol Iron Works, Neabsco Iron Works and later Occoquan Ironworks.

In April 1865, John Wilkes Booth made his escape through Charles County after shooting President Abraham Lincoln. He was on his way to Virginia. He stopped briefly in Waldorf (then called Beantown) and had his broken leg set by local Doctor Samuel Mudd, who was later sent to prison for helping him. Booth then proceeded to hide in the Zekiah Swamp in Charles County, avoiding search parties for over a week until he and his accomplice were able to successfully cross the Potomac River.

The 1911 Digges Amendment, which attempted to disenfranchise African Americans in Maryland, was drafted by Democratic state delegate (lower house) Walter Digges and co-sponsored by state senator (upper house) William J. Frere, both from Charles County, Maryland. In Maryland's unrestricted general election of 1911, the Digges Amendment was defeated with 46,220 votes for and 83,920 votes against the proposal. Nationally Maryland citizens achieved the most notable rejection of a black-disfranchising amendment.

In 1926, a tornado ripped through the county leaving 17 dead (including 13 schoolchildren). On April 28, 2002, another tornado (rated an F-4) destroyed much of downtown La Plata killing 3 and injuring over 100 people.

The county has numerous properties on the National Register of Historic Places. Among them are Green Park and Pleasant Hill, home of the Green and Spalding Families.

On December 4, 2004, an arson took place in the development of Hunters Brooke, a few miles southeast of Indian Head. The Hunters Brooke Arson was the largest residential arson in Maryland history.

== Politics and government ==
Owing to the considerable voting power of its large number of freedmen following the Civil War, and later its growth as a suburban area, Charles County was for a long time solidly Republican. The only Democrat to carry Charles County until 1960 was Franklin D. Roosevelt in 1932, although Alf Landon and Wendell Willkie defeated Roosevelt in the next two elections by a combined margin of just 50 votes. Since the turn of the millennium, Charles County has become reliably Democratic, although not as overwhelmingly so as other parts of Maryland's Washington, D.C. suburbs. Charles County is one of only two counties in the nation to have voted for Al Gore in 2000 after voting for Bob Dole in 1996, along with Orange County, Florida.

=== Voter registration ===
Voter registration and party enrollment as of March 2024
Democratic	74,828	60.43%
Unaffiliated	24,372	19.68%
Republican	22,962	18.54%
Libertarian	441	0.36%
Other parties	1,218	0.98%
Total	123,821	100%

United States presidential election results for Charles County, Maryland
Year	Republican		Democratic		Third party(ies)	
Year	No.	%	No.	%	No.	%
1892	1,279	53.49%	1,051	43.96%	61	2.55%
1896	2,117	59.99%	1,372	38.88%	40	1.13%
1900	2,268	61.93%	1,368	37.36%	26	0.71%
1904	1,659	57.80%	1,180	41.11%	31	1.08%
1908	1,643	57.23%	1,167	40.65%	61	2.12%
1912	1,573	59.45%	918	34.69%	155	5.86%
1916	1,374	48.06%	1,363	47.67%	122	4.27%
1920	2,585	60.54%	1,642	38.45%	43	1.01%
1924	2,215	56.59%	1,491	38.09%	208	5.31%
1928	2,522	57.44%	1,860	42.36%	9	0.20%
1932	1,851	42.35%	2,473	56.58%	47	1.08%
1936	2,623	49.64%	2,597	49.15%	64	1.21%
1940	2,716	49.71%	2,692	49.27%	56	1.02%
1944	2,755	59.50%	1,875	40.50%	0	0.00%
1948	2,703	58.49%	1,878	40.64%	40	0.87%
1952	4,334	56.13%	3,338	43.23%	49	0.63%
1956	5,088	56.41%	3,931	43.59%	0	0.00%
1960	4,560	45.41%	5,482	54.59%	0	0.00%
1964	3,455	34.55%	6,546	65.45%	0	0.00%
1968	4,645	38.50%	4,247	35.20%	3,173	26.30%
1972	9,665	67.34%	4,502	31.37%	186	1.30%
1976	7,792	45.00%	9,525	55.00%	0	0.00%
1980	11,807	53.62%	8,887	40.36%	1,326	6.02%
1984	16,132	60.97%	10,264	38.79%	64	0.24%
1988	20,828	63.57%	11,823	36.09%	113	0.34%
1992	17,293	44.97%	14,498	37.70%	6,663	17.33%
1996	17,432	48.66%	15,890	44.36%	2,501	6.98%
2000	21,768	48.82%	21,873	49.05%	951	2.13%
2004	28,442	48.84%	29,354	50.40%	445	0.76%
2008	25,732	36.69%	43,635	62.22%	760	1.08%
2012	25,178	33.47%	48,774	64.84%	1,270	1.69%
2016	25,614	32.71%	49,341	63.01%	3,348	4.28%
2020	25,579	28.58%	62,171	69.47%	1,748	1.95%
2024	26,145	28.39%	63,454	68.90%	2,498	2.71%

=== Board of Commissioners ===
Charles County is governed by county commissioners, the traditional form of county government in Maryland. There are five commissioners. As of 2022, they are:

Position	Name	Affiliation	District
President	Reuben Collins	Democratic	At-Large
Commissioner	Gilbert Bowling	Democratic	District 1
Commissioner	Thomasina Coates	Democratic	District 2
Commissioner	Amanda Stewart	Democratic	District 3
Commissioner	Ralph Patterson	Democratic	District 4

Charles County is entirely within the 5th Congressional District, which also includes Calvert, St. Mary's, and parts of Anne Arundel and Prince George's counties. The current representative is former Democratic House Majority Leader and former House Minority Whip Steny H. Hoyer.

== Geography ==
Washington-Arlington-Alexandria, DC-VA-MD-WV Metropolitan Statistical Area

According to the U.S. Census Bureau, the county has an area of 643 square miles (1,670 km^{2}), of which 458 square miles (1,190 km^{2}) is land and 185 square miles (480 km^{2}) (29%) water.

In its western wing, along the southernmost bend in Maryland Route 224, Charles County contains a place due north, east, south, and west of the same state—Virginia.

=== Adjacent counties ===
- Prince George's County (north)
- Fairfax County, Virginia (northwest)
- Calvert County (east)
- Stafford County, Virginia (west)
- Prince William County, Virginia (west)
- St. Mary's County (southeast)
- Westmoreland County, Virginia (southeast)
- King George County, Virginia (south)

=== National protected area ===
- Thomas Stone National Historic Site
- Mallows Bay–Potomac River National Marine Sanctuary

== Demographics ==
Historical population
Census	Pop.	Note	%±
1790	20,613		—
1800	19,172		−7.0%
1810	20,245		5.6%
1820	16,500		−18.5%
1830	17,769		7.7%
1840	16,023		−9.8%
1850	16,162		0.9%
1860	16,517		2.2%
1870	15,738		−4.7%
1880	18,548		17.9%
1890	15,191		−18.1%
1900	17,662		16.3%
1910	16,386		−7.2%
1920	17,705		8.0%
1930	16,166		−8.7%
1940	17,612		8.9%
1950	23,415		32.9%
1960	32,572		39.1%
1970	47,678		46.4%
1980	72,751		52.6%
1990	101,154		39.0%
2000	120,546		19.2%
2010	146,551		21.6%
2020	166,617		13.7%
2025 (est.)	176,593	▲	6.0%
U.S. Decennial Census; 1790-1960 1900-1990; 1990-2000 2010 2020

=== Racial and ethnic composition ===
Charles County, Maryland – Racial and ethnic composition Note: the US Census treats Hispanic/Latino as an ethnic category. This table excludes Latinos from the racial categories and assigns them to a separate category. Hispanics/Latinos may be of any race.
Race / Ethnicity (NH = Non-Hispanic)	Pop 1980	Pop 1990	Pop 2000	Pop 2010	Pop 2020	% 1980	% 1990	% 2000	% 2010	% 2020
White alone (NH)	56,162	79,115	81,111	70,905	56,832	77.20%	78.21%	67.29%	48.38%	34.11%
Black or African American alone (NH)	14,556	18,264	31,203	59,201	80,850	20.01%	18.06%	25.88%	40.40%	48.52%
Native American or Alaska Native alone (NH)	478	737	858	877	995	0.66%	0.73%	0.71%	0.60%	0.60%
Asian alone (NH)	491	1,279	2,169	4,296	5,624	0.67%	1.26%	1.80%	2.93%	3.38%
Native Hawaiian or Pacific Islander alone (NH)	x	x	66	87	147	x	x	0.05%	0.06%	0.09%
Other race alone (NH)	124	54	199	243	957	0.17%	0.05%	0.17%	0.17%	0.57%
Mixed race or Multiracial (NH)	x	x	2,218	4,683	9,535	x	x	1.84%	3.20%	5.72%
Hispanic or Latino (any race)	940	1,705	2,722	6,259	11,677	1.29%	1.69%	2.26%	4.27%	7.01%
Total	72,751	101,154	120,546	146,551	166,617	100.00%	100.00%	100.00%	100.00%	100.00%

=== 2020 census ===
As of the 2020 census, the county had a population of 166,617. The median age was 38.8 years. 24.0% of residents were under the age of 18 and 13.1% of residents were 65 years of age or older. For every 100 females there were 90.7 males, and for every 100 females age 18 and over there were 86.8 males age 18 and over. 71.6% of residents lived in urban areas, while 28.4% lived in rural areas.

The racial makeup of the county was 35.2% White, 49.2% Black or African American, 0.7% American Indian and Alaska Native, 3.4% Asian, 0.1% Native Hawaiian and Pacific Islander, 3.3% from some other race, and 8.0% from two or more races. Hispanic or Latino residents of any race comprised 7.0% of the population.

There were 59,107 households in the county, of which 36.4% had children under the age of 18 living with them and 30.1% had a female householder with no spouse or partner present. About 22.4% of all households were made up of individuals and 7.9% had someone living alone who was 65 years of age or older.

There were 62,123 housing units, of which 4.9% were vacant. Among occupied housing units, 77.5% were owner-occupied and 22.5% were renter-occupied. The homeowner vacancy rate was 1.4% and the rental vacancy rate was 5.0%.

=== 2010 census ===
As of the 2010 United States census, there were 146,551 people, 51,214 households, and 38,614 families residing in the county. The population density was 320.2 inhabitants per square mile (123.6/km^{2}). There were 54,963 housing units at an average density of 120.1 per square mile (46.4/km^{2}). The racial makeup of the county was 50.3% white, 41.0% black or African American, 3.0% Asian, 0.7% American Indian, 0.1% Pacific islander, 1.3% from other races, and 3.7% from two or more races. Those of Hispanic or Latino origin made up 4.3% of the population. In terms of ancestry, 12.6% were German, 10.8% were Irish, 8.7% were English, 6.3% were American, and 5.1% were Italian.

Of the 51,214 households, 41.6% had children under the age of 18 living with them, 54.2% were married couples living together, 16.3% had a female householder with no husband present, 24.6% were non-families, and 19.8% of all households were made up of individuals. The average household size was 2.83 and the average family size was 3.24. The median age was 37.4 years.

The median income for a household in the county was $88,825 and the median income for a family was $98,560. Males had a median income of $62,210 versus $52,477 for females. The per capita income for the county was $35,780. About 3.7% of families and 5.2% of the population were below the poverty line, including 6.8% of those under age 18 and 4.6% of those age 65 or over.

As of 2010, the county population's racial makeup was 48.38% Non-Hispanic whites, 40.96% blacks, 0.65% Native Americans, 2.98% Asian, 0.07% Pacific Islanders, 0.17% Non-Hispanics of some other race, 3.20% Non-Hispanics reporting more than one race and 4.27% Hispanic.

=== 2000 census ===
As of the census of 2000, there were 120,546 people, 41,668 households, and 32,292 families residing in the county. The population density was 262 inhabitants per square mile (101/km^{2}). There were 43,903 housing units at an average density of 95 per square mile (37/km^{2}). The racial makeup of the county was 68.51% White, 26.06% Black or African American, 0.75% Native American, 1.82% Asian, 0.06% Pacific Islander, 0.72% from other races, and 2.08% from two or more races. 2.26% of the population were Hispanic or Latino of any race. 11.6% were of German, 10.8% Irish, 10.2% English, 9.3% American and 5.3% Italian ancestry.

There were 41,668 households, out of which 41.10% had children under the age of 18 living with them, 58.00% were married couples living together, 14.50% had a female householder with no husband present, and 22.50% were non-families. 17.20% of all households were made up of individuals, and 5.20% had someone living alone who was 65 years of age or older. The average household size was 2.86 and the average family size was 3.21.

In the county, the population was spread out, with 28.70% under the age of 18, 7.60% from 18 to 24, 33.20% from 25 to 44, 22.70% from 45 to 64, and 7.80% who were 65 years of age or older. The median age was 35 years. For every 100 females, there were 95.50 males. For every 100 females age 18 and over, there were 92.20 males.

The median income for a household in the county was $62,199, and the median income for a family was $67,602 (these figures had risen to $80,573 and $89,358 respectively as of a 2007 estimate). Males had a median income of $43,371 versus $34,231 for females. The per capita income for the county was $24,285. About 3.70% of families and 5.50% of the population were below the poverty line, including 6.70% of those under age 18 and 8.60% of those age 65 or over.

== Economy ==
=== Top employers ===
According to the 2022 publication "Meet Charles County" of the County Department of Economic Development, its top employers are:

#	Employer	# of Employees
1	Naval Surface Warfare Center / Naval Support Facility Indian Head	3,834
2	Charles County Public Schools / Board of Education	3,701
3	Charles County Government	1,814
4	University of Maryland Charles Regional Medical Center	775
5	Walmart / Sam's Club	637
6	College of Southern Maryland	602
7	Waldorf Chevy/Cadillac, Ford, Toyota/Scion, Dodge	583
8	Southern Maryland Electric Cooperative (SMECO)	471
9	Safeway	465
10	Target	465
11	The Wills Group	344
12	Lowe's	332
13	Chick-fil-A	294
14	ADJ Sheet Metal	280
15	Restore Health Rehabilitation, La Plata Center	260
16	Sagepoint Senior Living Services	250

== Education ==
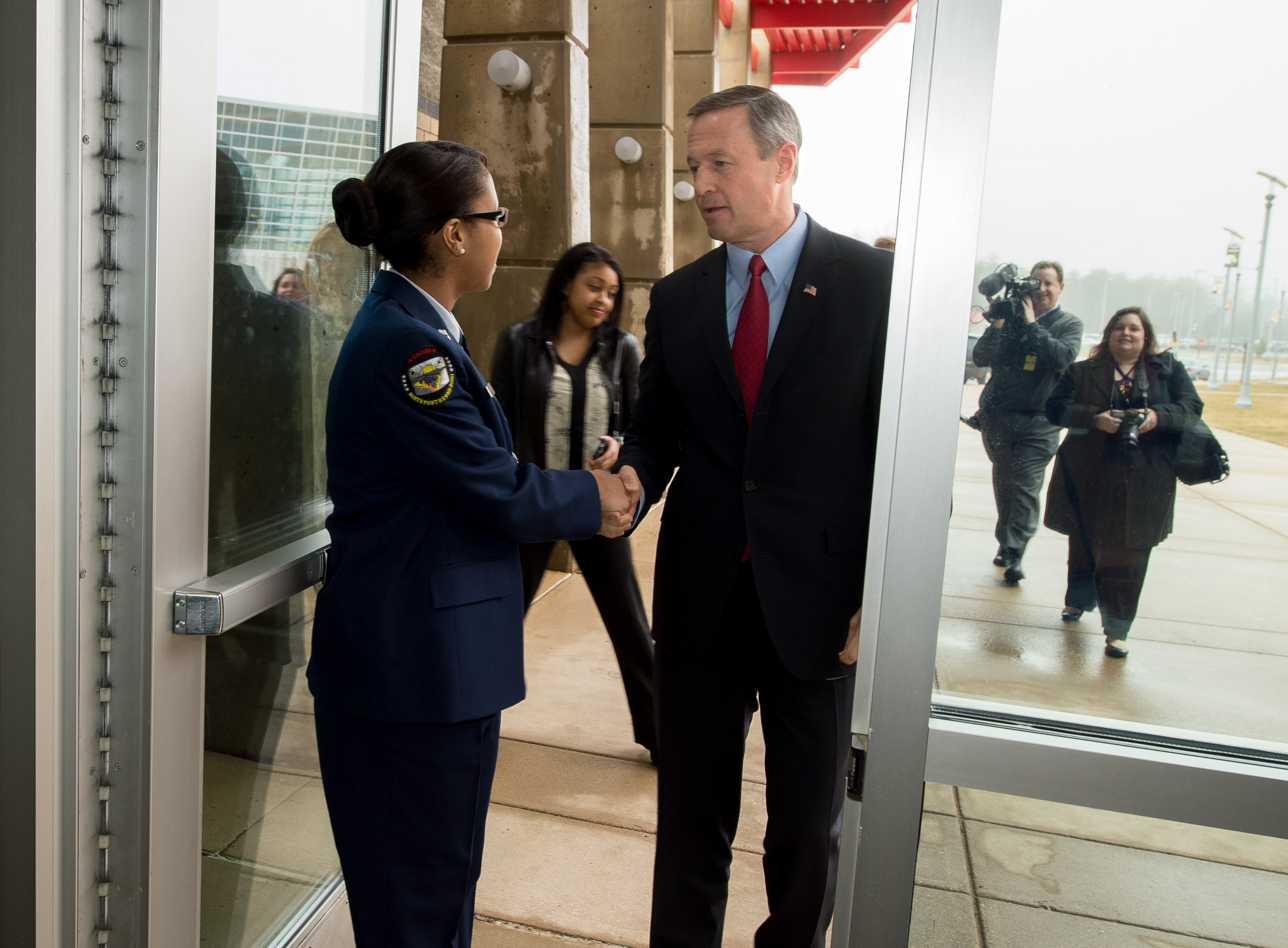
Maryland Governor Martin O'Malley visits North Point High School, the largest high school in Charles County

=== Public schools ===
The area school district is the Charles County Public Schools system. With over 27,765 students, the system operates seven high schools, eight middle schools, twenty-three elementary schools, and one charter school.

=== Private schools ===
The Beddow Schools operates a campus in Waldorf known as the Waldorf Montessori School. Additionally, St. Peter's School is a Catholic school in Waldorf.

=== Colleges and universities ===
The College of Southern Maryland operates locations in La Plata, Hughesville, and Indian Head, along with additional campuses in neighboring St. Mary's and Calvert counties.

== Transportation ==
Charles County is served by numerous state highways and one U.S. Highway:

=== Major highways ===
- US 301
- MD 5
- MD 5 Bus.
- MD 5 Bus.
- MD 6
- MD 210
- MD 224
- MD 225
- MD 227
- MD 228
- MD 229
- MD 231
- MD 234
- MD 254
- MD 257
- MD 381
- MD 425
- MD 426
- MD 488
- MD 925

== Communities ==
=== Towns ===
- Indian Head
- La Plata (county seat)
- Port Tobacco Village

=== Census-designated places ===
The Census Bureau recognizes the following census-designated places in the county:

- Benedict
- Bensville
- Bryans Road
- Bryantown
- Charlotte Hall (shared with Saint Mary's County)
- Cobb Island
- Hughesville
- Pomfret
- Potomac Heights
- Rock Point
- Waldorf

=== Unincorporated communities ===
- Bel Alton
- Benedict
- Dentsville
- Faulkner
- Glymont
- Grayton
- Ironsides
- Issue
- Malcolm
- Marbury
- Morgantown
- Mount Victoria
- Nanjemoy
- Newburg
- Pisgah
- Popes Creek
- Port Tobacco
- Pomonkey
- Ripley
- Rison
- Saint Charles
- Swan Point
- Welcome
- White Plains

== Notable people ==
=== Colonial and Revolutionary Periods ===
- Charles Brooke (1636–1671) English immigrant & first Southerner to graduate from Harvard College, Class of 1655; Sheriff, Calvert County 1665
- Gustavus Richard Brown (1747–1804) Edinburgh-educated doctor; served in Revolutionary War; physician to George Washington, attended his death
- James Craik (1727–1814) Scottish immigrant; Physician General of the Continental Army; friend & physician to George Washington, attended his death
- John Hanson (1721–1783) born Port Tobacco; Founding Father of United States; Signer, Articles of Confederation; President, Confederation Congress
- Robert H. Harrison (1745-1790), judge; officer in the Continental Army; George Washington's military secretary.
- Daniel of St. Thomas Jenifer (1723–1790) born Port Tobacco; Founding Father of U.S.; Delegate, Constitutional Convention; Signer, U.S. Constitution
- Capt. James Neale (1615–1684) born in London, immigrated around 1635; Member, Maryland Council; founded Wollaston Manor & Cobb Island
- Leonard Neale (1746–1817) born Port Tobacco; Jesuit President of Georgetown; Archbishop of Baltimore; first U.S.-consecrated Catholic prelate (1800)
- William Smallwood (1732–1792) Officer, Provincial Troops; Major General, 1st Maryland Regiment of the Continental Army; Governor of Maryland
- Benjamin Stoddert (1751–1813) Captain of Cavalry in the Continental Army; first U.S. Secretary of the Navy in the John Adams administration
- Thomas Stone (1743–1787) born at Poynton Manor near Port Tobacco; Founding Father of the United States; Signer, U.S. Declaration of Independence
- Andrew White (1579–1656) born in London; Jesuit with first colonists arriving on Ark & Dove; established mission to the Potapoco at Chapel Point (1641)

=== 19th century ===
- George Cary (1789–1843) born near Allen's Fresh; practiced law in Frederick; moved to Appling County, Georgia; Member, U.S. House 1823-27
- Barnes Compton (1830–1898) born Port Tobacco, Princeton '51; Pres., Maryland Senate; Treasurer of Maryland; Member, U.S. House 1885-90,91-94
- Josiah Henson (1789–1883) born into slavery in Port Tobacco; escaped to Canada & founded community of fugitive slaves; author, abolitionist & minister
- Jane Herbert Wilkinson Long (1798–1880) born Charles County; Texas Patriot & boarding-house matron; dubbed "Mother of Texas" by Sam Houston
- Samuel A. Mudd (1833–1883) born near Bryantown; physician imprisoned for aiding John Wilkes Booth after assassination of Pres. Abraham Lincoln
- Sydney E. Mudd (1858–1911) born in Gallant Green; Speaker, Maryland House of Delegates; Member, U.S. House of Reps 1890–91, 1897-1911
- Francis Neale (1756–1836) born Port Tobacco; Jesuit pastor of St. Thomas Manor & Holy Trinity, first Catholic Church in D.C., President of Georgetown
- Raphael Semmes (1809–1877) born near Nanjemoy; US Navy officer; Captain, CSS Sumter & CSS Alabama; Rear Adm., Confederate States Navy

=== 20th & 21st centuries ===
- Walter M. Digges (1877–1934) Delegate who drafted Digges Amendment that was defeated in statewide election; Justice, Court of Appeals 1923–34
- Danny Gatton (1945–1994) Virtuoso guitarist; created a jazz fusion musical style he called "redneck jazz"; lived in Newburg, died by suicide
- Matthew Henson (1866–1955) born in Nanjemoy; African-American explorer; first to reach North Pole in 1909, with Robert Peary & 4 Inuit companions
- Larry Johnson (born 1979) from Pomfret; former NFL running back; played for K.C. Chiefs, Cincinnati Bengals, Washington Redskins & Miami Dolphins
- Shawn Lemon (born 1988) Attended Westlake H.S. in Waldorf; played with seven teams in the Canadian Football League as a defensive lineman
- Joel & Benji Madden (born 1979) Identical twins from Waldorf; both with bands The Madden Brothers & Good Charlotte; Benji married to Cameron Diaz
- Christina Milian (born 1981) Movie & TV actress; Top 40 singer/songwriter in US (Top 4 in UK); raised in Waldorf to age 13 & part of high school
- Sydney E. Mudd, Jr. (1885–1924) born in Gallant Green; Member, U.S. House of Representatives; 1915-1924, died in office
- Randy Starks (born 1983) Attended Westlake in Waldorf; played NFL as a defensive end with Tennessee Titans, Miami Dolphins & Cleveland Browns
- Robert Stethem (1961–1985) U.S. Navy diver; murdered in Beirut during hijacking of TWA Flight 847; grew up in Pinefield community of Waldorf
- Turkey Tayac (1895–1978) born Charles County; Chief, one branch of Piscataway Indian Nation and Tayac Territory; WWI veteran; Medicine Man & Native American activist
- Angela Renée White a.k.a. "Blac Chyna" (born 1988) Model, socialite & television personality; attended Henry E. Lackey High School in Indian Head
- Matt Sallee (born 1994) Singer, member of the a cappella group Pentatonix; grew up in La Plata and graduated from Maurice J McDonough High School

== Sports ==
Club	League	Venue	Established	Championships
Southern Maryland Blue Crabs	ALPB, Baseball	Regency Furniture Stadium	2008	0

== See also ==
- Carpenter Point, Charles County, Maryland
- Charles County Sheriff's Office
- National Register of Historic Places listings in Charles County, Maryland
