= St. Peter's School, Waldorf =

St. Peter's School

Location
- 3310 St. Peter's Drive; Waldorf, Maryland 20601; United States
- Coordinates: 38°37′14.9″N 76°51′43.9″W

Information
- Denomination: Catholic
- Patron saint: Saint Peter
- Established: 1956; 70 years ago
- Principal: Tina Wagner
- Grades: Pre-K - 8
- Enrollment: 270 (2023)
- Team name: Storm; Skippers
- Website: St. Peter's School website

St. Peter's School is a Catholic school located in Waldorf, Maryland. Founded in 1956 by Rev. Henry Sank, it was the first Catholic school in Southern Maryland that was never racially segregated. St. Peter's School is a part of the St. Peter's Catholic Church community and an Archdiocese of Washington Catholic School; it currently offers classes for students from pre-kindergarten through eighth grade.
