= Swan Point, Maryland =

Unincorporated community in Maryland, United States

- Unincorporated community
- Location within the state of Maryland Swan Point (the United States)
- Coordinates: 38°18′22″N 76°55′10″W
- Country: United States
- State: Maryland
- County: Charles
- Time zone: UTC-5 (Eastern (EST))
  - Summer (DST): UTC-4 (EDT)
- ZIP code: 20645-2217
- GNIS feature ID: 1677156

Swan Point is an unincorporated community in southern Charles County, Maryland, United States. The Swan Point Yacht and Country Club was originally planned and initiated in the 1980s around an 18-hole waterfront championship golf course; Since then there has been added: a community waterfront pool, a marina, clubhouse, trails, and tennis courts. Custom homes of various types styles and prices populate the wooded 1/3 to 1/2 acre lots. Some have a water view, water frontage, or golf course frontage. There are plans for additional homesites in 2012, which will contain cluster homes, townhouses as well as more single-family homes. Swan Point Yacht & Country is located on the banks of the Potomac River. Issue, MD is also considered part of Swan Point, MD since the 20645 zip code was made to include both names in 2009. Legend has it that Swan Point received its name from Captain John Smith when he explored the region in the early 17th century and saw thousands of wintering Swans in the water off that point of land. Charles County, Maryland is also home to an early settler of Maryland, Edward Swann. . Current historical findings likely associate the naming of Swan's point to Edward Swann who was granted 1200 acres of land mostly in Charles Co, MD, by Lord Baltimore.
