= Hobbs, Maryland =

Unincorporated community in Maryland, U.S.

Coordinates: 38°51′41″N 75°47′04″W

Hobbs is an unincorporated community in Caroline County, Maryland, United States.

The American Discovery Trail runs through the village.
