= Pisgah, Maryland =

Unincorporated community in Maryland, United States

- Unincorporated community
- Location within the state of Maryland Pisgah (the United States)
- Coordinates: 38°32′46″N 77°08′05″W
- Country: United States
- State: Maryland
- County: Charles
- Time zone: UTC-5 (Eastern (EST))
  - Summer (DST): UTC-4 (EDT)

Pisgah is an unincorporated community in Charles County, Maryland, United States.

== Pisgah Park ==
Pisgah Park is a recreational park located at 6645 Mason Springs Road, offering amenities such as an athletic field, pavilion, playground, restrooms, softball field, and a 0.75-mile paved walking path. The softball fields are accessible only with a reservation, except Field B1.
