= Dentsville, Maryland =

Unincorporated community in Maryland, United States

- Unincorporated community
- Location within the state of Maryland Dentsville (the United States)
- Coordinates: 38°28′54″N 76°53′33″W
- Country: United States
- State: Maryland
- County: Charles
- Time zone: UTC-5 (Eastern (EST))
  - Summer (DST): UTC-4 (EDT)
- GNIS feature ID: 584094

Dentsville is an unincorporated community in Charles County, Maryland, United States. It is marked by Cooksey's Store, a convenience store dating from 1896, two cemeteries, and adjacent small businesses. The Dentsville Rescue Squad and Auxiliary, founded in 1998, is on Maryland Route 6, east of La Plata.

Dentsville was named after the Dent family, who have resided locally since colonial times. Dentsville's first appearance on a map of Maryland dates from 1886.
