= Christ Church (Owensville, Maryland) =

Historic church in Maryland, United States

- U.S. National Register of Historic Places
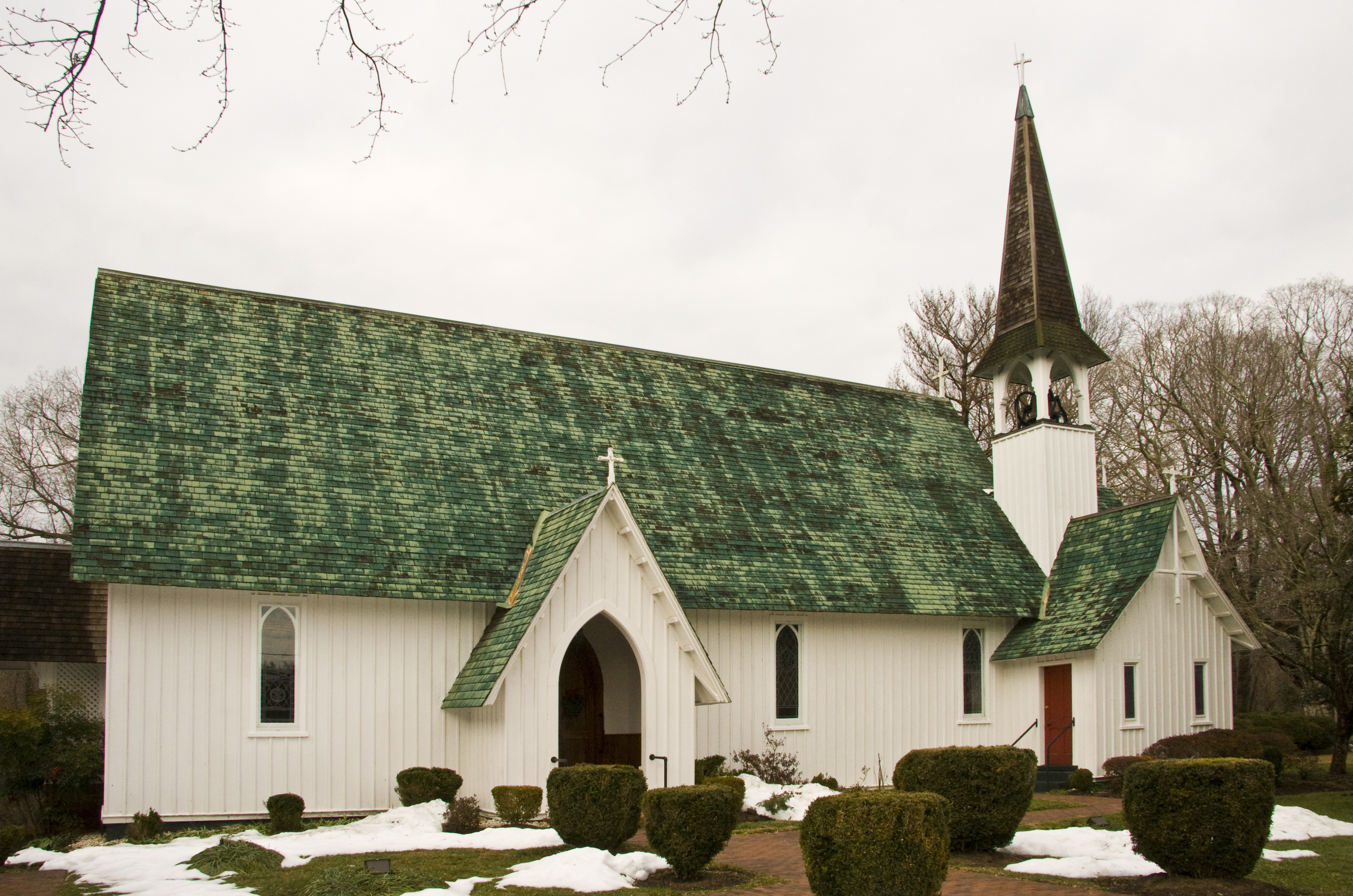
- Christ Church, January 2010

- Location within Maryland Location within the United States
- Location: Owensville Rd. (MD 255); Owensville, Maryland, U.S.
- Coordinates: 38°51′10″N 76°35′46″W
- Area: 16 acres (6.5 ha)
- Built: 1869
- Architectural style: Gothic Revival
- NRHP reference No.: 73000898
- Added to NRHP: June 18, 1973

Christ Church, or Christ Episcopal Church, West River, is an historic Carpenter Gothic style Episcopal church at Owensville, Anne Arundel County, Maryland, United States. It is a small, board-and-batten church with a long narrow nave, small deep chancel, and an entrance porch on its south side. The church is reputed to be by the noted church architect, Richard Upjohn and was at least built from his published designs of 1852.

Christ Church was listed on the National Register of Historic Places in 1973.
