= Wicomico River (Potomac River tributary) =

Coordinates: 38°17′12″N 76°49′37″W

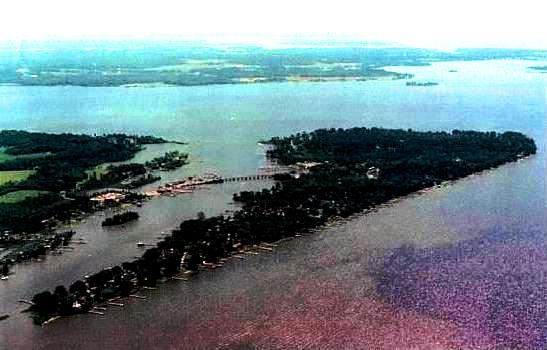
- Cobb Island, MD is at the junction of Neale Sound, Wicomico River, and the Potomac River

Location
- Country: United States
- State: Maryland

Physical characteristics
- Mouth
  - location: Potomac River
  - elevation: 0 feet (0 m)
- Length: 13.0 miles (20.9 km)

The Wicomico River is a 13.0-mile-long (20.9 km) tributary of the lower tidal portion of the Potomac River located in the U.S. state of Maryland south of Washington, DC. The river empties into the Potomac at Cobb Island and St. Margaret's Island. Its watershed area (excluding water) is 77 square miles (200 km^{2}), with 2% impervious surface in 1994 in Charles, St. Mary's, and southern Prince George's counties. The lower section of the river forms part of the boundary between Charles and St. Mary's counties. The Wicomico River was designated a Scenic River under the Maryland Scenic River Act in 1968. Scenic River Commissions oversee it in Charles and St. Mary's counties. (see links below).

== Tributaries ==
- Allens Fresh Run
  - Willmer Creek
  - Cramer Gut
  - Posey Creek
  - Tears Gut
  - Steinhauser Gut
  - Bunker Hill Branch
  - Foggy Bottoms Gut
  - Colby Run
  - Newport Marsh Run
- Newport Run
  - Hickory Gut
  - St. Clair Gut
  - Murphy Run
- Hodister Run
- Lloyd Drain
- Bowling Gut
- Budds Creek
- Chaptico Bay
  - Chaptico Run
  - Burroughs Run
  - Bull Run
- Maddox Creek
- Charleston Creek
- Neale Sound
