= Owensville, Maryland =

Unincorporated community in Maryland, United States

- Unincorporated community
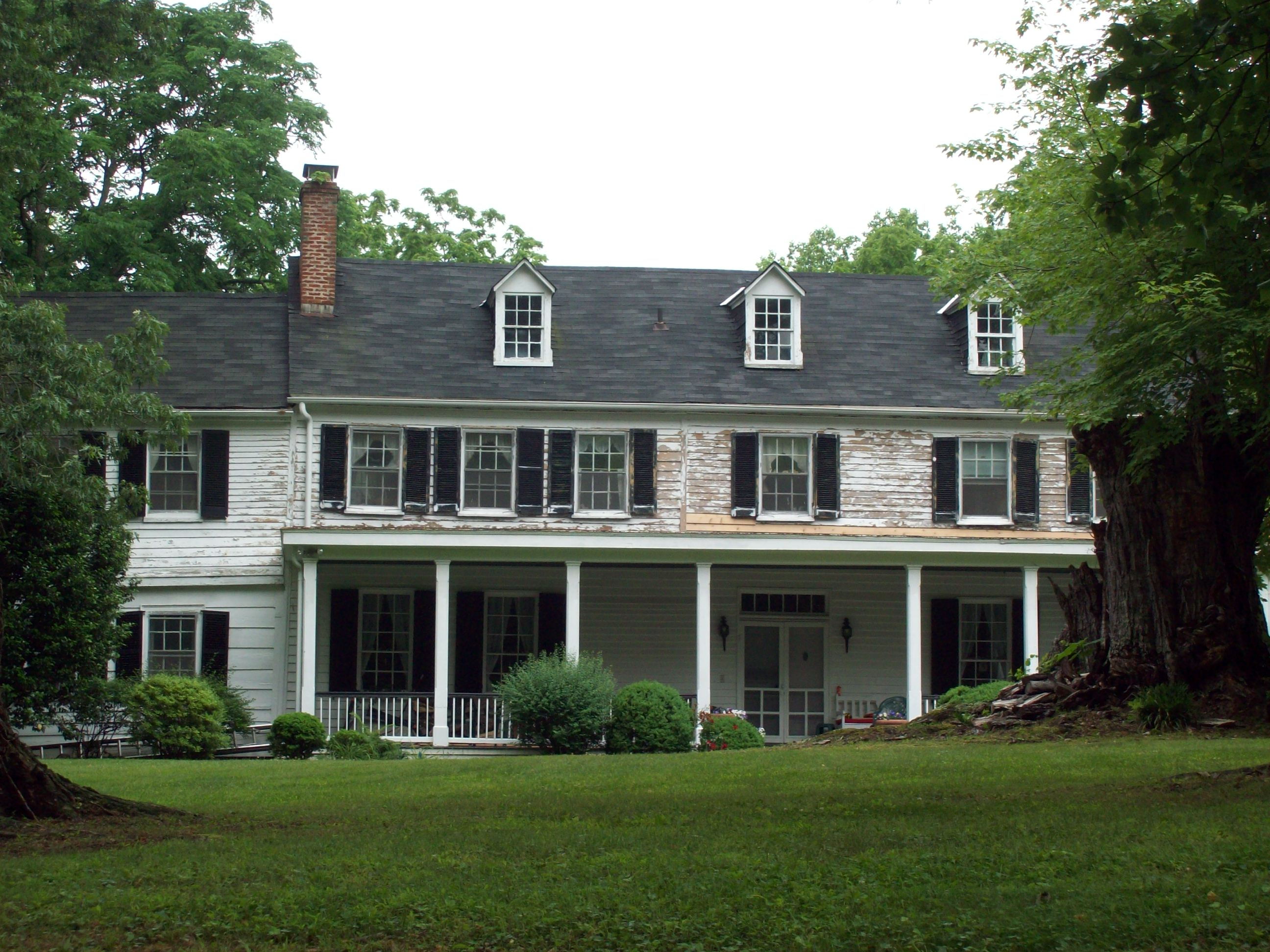
- Evergreen, a historic house in Owensville

- Location within the state of Maryland Owensville, Maryland (the United States)
- Coordinates: 38°44′11″N 76°38′40″W
- Country: United States
- State: Maryland
- County: Anne Arundel
- Time zone: UTC-5 (Eastern (EST))
  - Summer (DST): UTC-4 (EDT)

Owensville is an unincorporated community in Anne Arundel County, Maryland, United States.
