= Cobb Island (Maryland) =

Cobb Island, Maryland
- Census-designated place
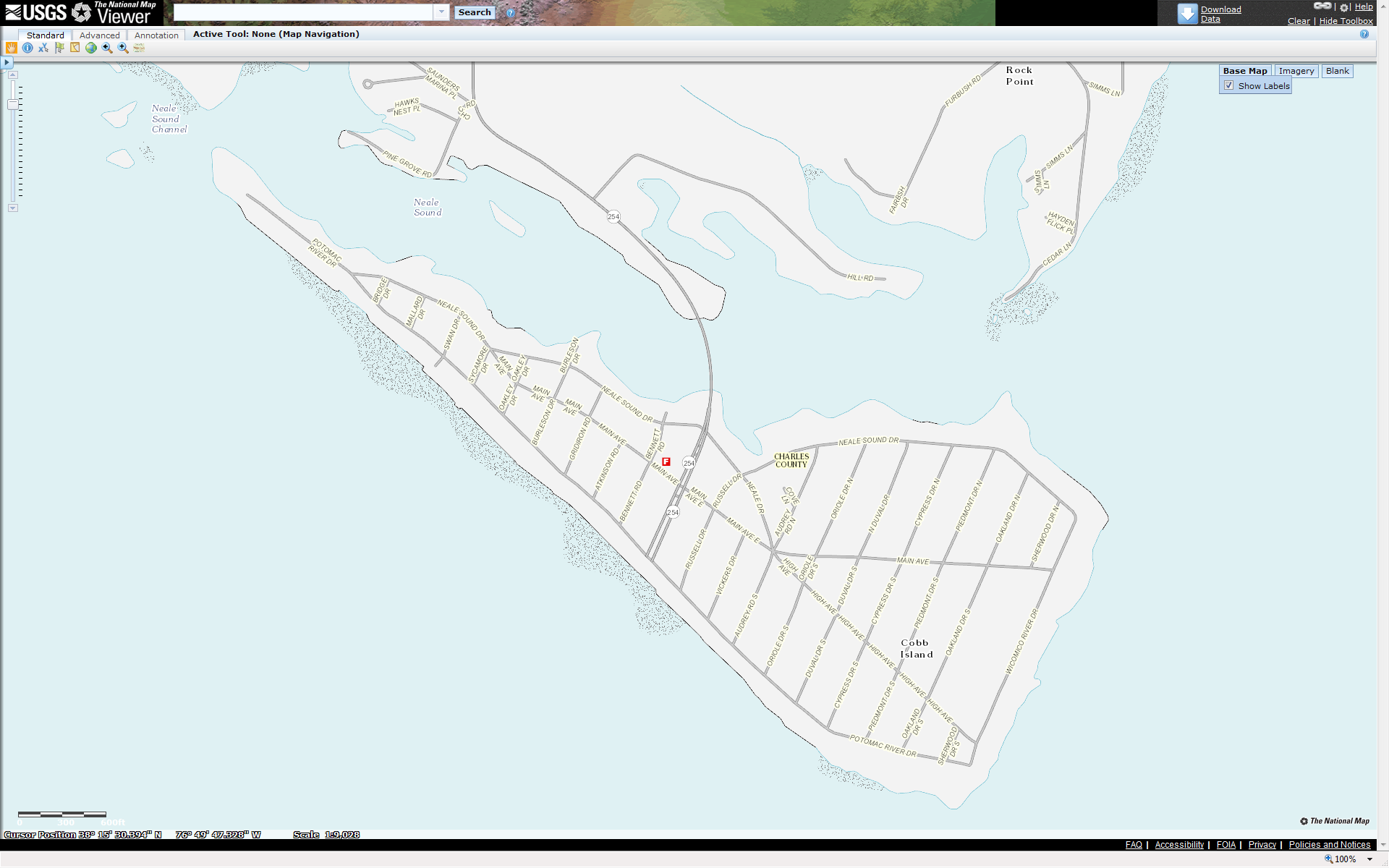
- Location of Cobb Island, Charles County, Maryland
- Coordinates: 38°15′30″N 76°50′38″W
- Country: United States
- State: Maryland
- County: Charles

Area
  - Total: 0.92 sq mi (2.39 km^{2})
  - Land: 0.63 sq mi (1.62 km^{2})
  - Water: 0.30 sq mi (0.77 km^{2})
- Elevation: 9.8 ft (3 m)

Population (2020)
  - Total: 929
  - Density: 1,484.5/sq mi (573.16/km^{2})
- Time zone: UTC-5 (Eastern (EST))
  - Summer (DST): UTC-4 (EDT)
- ZIP code: 20625
- GNIS feature ID: 1988529

Cobb Island is a small island located at the confluence of the Potomac and Wicomico rivers in southern Charles County, Maryland, United States. It is located approximately 45 miles (72 km) south of Washington, and is considered to be within the Washington, D.C. MSA. Cobb Island is separated from the mainland by Neale Sound and connected to it by a 0.11-mile-long (180 m) fixed bridge carrying Maryland Route 254.

Cobb Island is an unincorporated community and census-designated place (CDP). As of the 2010 census, the CDP had a population of 1,166. The community has a small post office, a volunteer fire department and rescue squad, a Baptist church, a large community green space (Fisherman's Field) and a small playground for children. Commercially, there are two seafood restaurants with marinas, a marina with a pizzeria restaurant chain, a small bar and grill, a seasonal coffee shop, art gallery and bakery, and a small market.

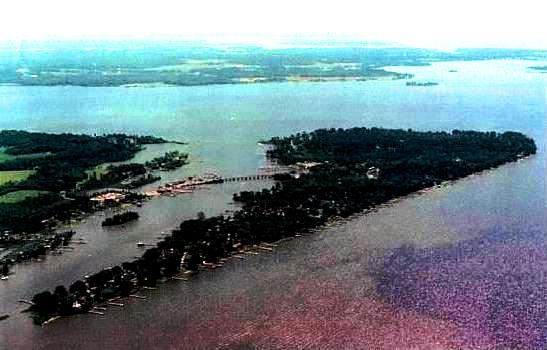
The Neale Sound, Wicomico River, and Potomac River join at Cobb Island

== History ==
=== Name origin and privateer past ===
The Island was owned in 1642 by James Neal, a privateer (a legal pirate working for the British Empire) who captured Spanish ships bearing treasure to Spain from Central America. Captured Spanish coins were cut into "cobbs" (smaller coins) and distributed to Maryland colonists, which led to the name "Cobb Island".

=== World's first human voice radio transmission ===
On December 23, 1900, Reginald Aubrey Fessenden sent and received the first intelligible speech by electromagnetic waves on a pair of masts 50 feet (15 m) high and 1 mile (1.6 km) apart on Cobb Island. Fessenden was using a spark transmitter with a Kintner-Brashear interrupter.

=== 20th century and later ===
Robert Crain bought Cobb Island and organized the Cobb Island Development Company. In 1922 and 1923, the company constructed roads, a summer resort and a bridge to the island.

== Demographics ==
Historical population
Census	Pop.	Note	%±
2020	929		—
U.S. Decennial Census; 2010 2020

Cobb Island first appeared as a census designated place in the 2010 U.S. census.
