= Southern Maryland =

Coordinates: 38°28′N 76°48′W

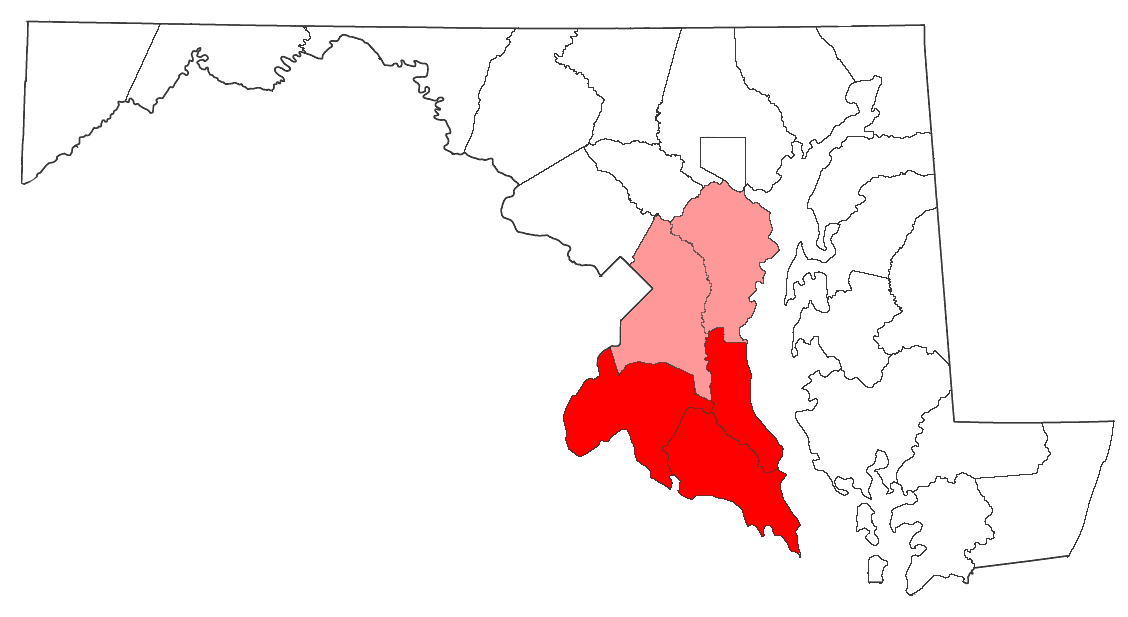
- A map of the counties of Southern Maryland. According to the state of Maryland, the region includes all of Calvert, Charles, and St. Mary's counties (red) and the southern portions of Anne Arundel and Prince George's counties (light red).
- Country: United States
- State: Maryland
- Largest community: Waldorf
- Counties: List: Calvert; Charles; St. Mary's

Population (2020 Census)
  - Total: 373,177
- Time zone: UTC−5 (EST)
  - Summer (DST): UTC−4 (EDT)

Southern Maryland, also referred to as SoMD, is a geographical, cultural and historic region in Maryland composed of the state's southernmost counties on the Western Shore of the Chesapeake Bay. According to the state of Maryland, the region includes all of Calvert, Charles, and St. Mary's counties. As of the 2020 Census, the region had a population of 373,177. The largest community in Southern Maryland is Waldorf, with a population of 81,410 as of the 2020 Census.

Native American groups, such as the Piscataway people, initially inhabited Southern Maryland. Following exploration by English explorer John Smith, the first European settlement in Southern Maryland (and the state as a whole) was established in St. Mary's City in 1634. While the settlement was intended to be a Catholic refuge, religious strife was prominent in Maryland's early years. The passage of the Maryland Toleration Act in 1649 resulted in St. Mary's City being cited as the birthplace of religious freedom in North America. The area developed an agricultural economy based on tobacco with labor sourced from indentured servants and slaves. The War of 1812 saw military action in the region during the British campaign to capture Washington, while the American Civil War saw the end of slavery in Maryland and John Wilkes Booth fleeing through the region following the Assassination of Abraham Lincoln. Much of the area remains rural with agriculture still playing a large role in the region's economy. Despite this, the region has seen large suburban growth and development in the late 20th and early 21st centuries as urban sprawl from nearby Washington, D.C., expands southward.

In 2023, the region was designated as the Southern Maryland National Heritage Area.

== Geography ==
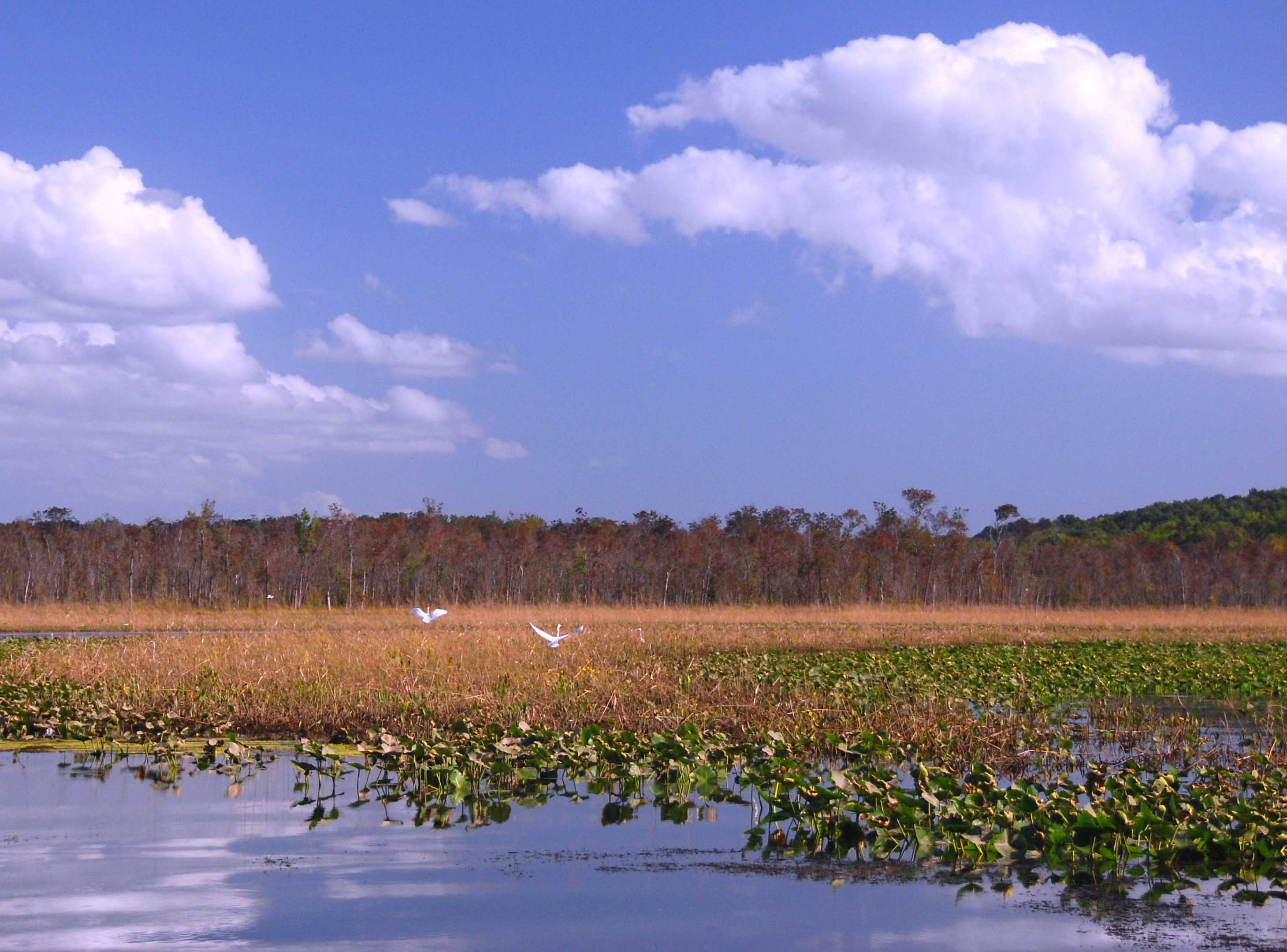
A tidal estuary in Mattawoman Creek

Counties located in Southern Maryland include Calvert County, Charles County, St. Mary's County. Southern Maryland's eastern boundary is the Chesapeake Bay and its southern and western boundary is the Potomac River, Maryland's boundary with Virginia (and through it, the Northern Neck).

The Patuxent River runs through Southern Maryland, separating Calvert County and Anne Arundel County from Charles County, Prince George's County and St. Mary's County.

Land features in Southern Maryland include the St. Mary's Peninsula and the Calvert Peninsula.

Geologic formations of the Chesapeake Group can be found in Southern Maryland, including the Calvert Formation, the St. Marys Formation, and the Choptank Formation. Many of these formations are present at the Calvert Cliffs State Park in Calvert County.

Southern Maryland is within the Atlantic Coastal Plain physiographic region.

== History ==
=== Indigenous peoples ===
Native Americans have inhabited Southern Maryland since at least 12,000 years ago. Settlements include Moyaone, also known as the Accokeek Creek Site, which has been intermittently inhabited for 6,000 years, and the Biscoe Gray Heritage Farm, which was inhabited as early as 200 CE.

The Piscataway people have been the historically dominant tribe, with territory including Southern Maryland and extending from modern-day Baltimore County to the Appalachian Mountains foothills. Other groups include the Yaocomico, which inhabited an area around the St. Mary's River, the Potapoco, who inhabited an area around Port Tobacco, the Mattawoman, who lived along Mattawoman Creek, the Patuxent people, who lived along the Chesapeake Bay, and the Chaptico, who resided by the Wicomico and Port Tobacco rivers. These groups were Algonquian as they spoke Algonquian languages. They were also of the Eastern Woodland culture group.

Following an executive order by governor Martin O'Malley in 2012, the state of Maryland recognizes two Piscataway tribes, the Piscataway Indian Nation and Tayac Territory and the Piscataway-Conoy Tribe of Maryland.

=== Colonial era ===
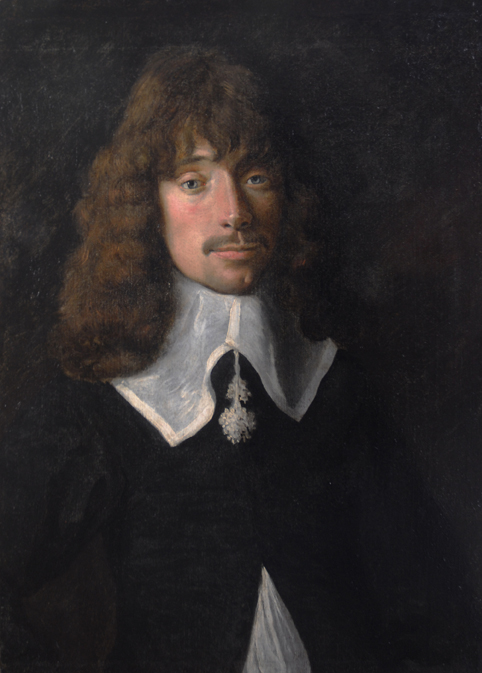
Leonard Calvert, first Proprietary Governor of the Maryland Colony

English explorer Captain John Smith explored the area in 1608, where he and his men encountered local indigenous groups.

Cecilius Calvert was granted a charter to establish a colony meant to be a safe-haven for Catholics in 1632. Expeditions were launched into modern day Maryland, with an expedition reaching St. Clement's Island in 1634. Later that year, the Maryland Colony was established by Leonard Calvert, first Governor of Maryland and brother of Cecilius. The colony's capital, and first settlement, was the newly established St. Mary's City. The colony originally focused on tobacco farming and was very successful although disease was a problem and many settlers died until immunities built up in the population. Religious tensions and also periods of open conflict also continued to be a major challenge.

St. Mary's City is widely considered to be the birthplace of religious freedom in North America. The colony there started under a mandate of religious tolerance in a time when England was anything but religiously tolerant. This was due to the colony's charter, which did not prohibit non-protestant churches. In 1649, the Maryland Colonial Assembly passed of one of the earliest laws requiring religious tolerance, known as the Maryland Toleration Act of 1649.

After 61 years as Maryland's capital an uprising of Protestants put an end to religious tolerance, overthrowing the old Catholic leadership and putting an end to colonial St. Mary's City itself, moving the colonial capital to Annapolis.

=== Plantation economy and slavery ===
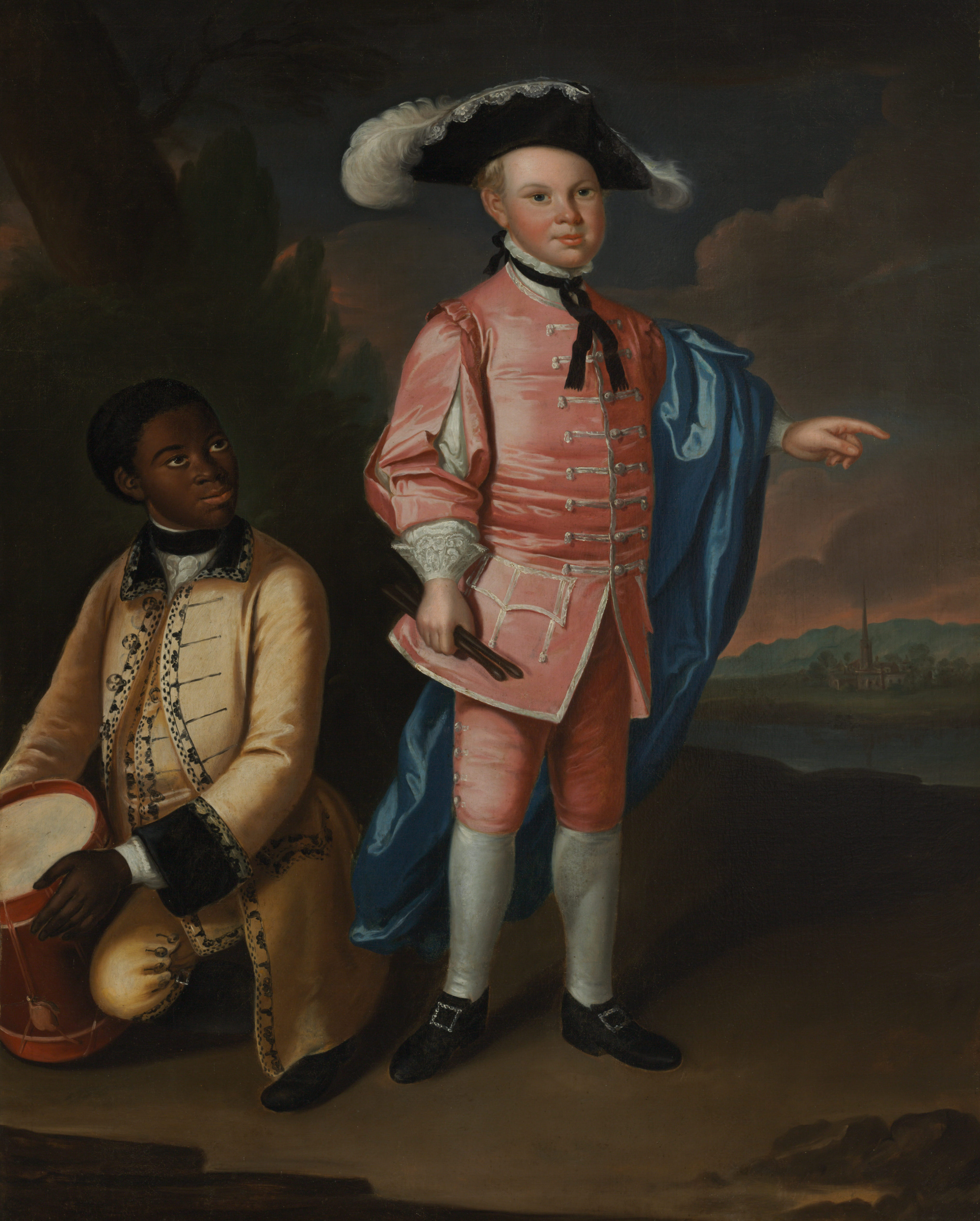
1761 portrait of Charles Calvert with a slave by John Hesselius. Charles Calvert was the eldest son of Benedict Swingate Calvert, who was the third Proprietary Governor of Maryland.

St. Mary's City was abandoned as a capital but was slowly consolidated from smaller farms into a large, single slave plantation by the late 1600s. Originally, laborers were Indentured Servants, with African slaves arriving in 1639. Tobacco and (later) also wheat plantations expanded there and in Southern Maryland as a whole during the slavery era. The Trans-Atlantic Slave Trade brought African slaves by the boatloads, with 100,000 slaves disembarking in Maryland during the century before the American Revolution. From the late 1600s to early 1700s, about half of Maryland's enslaved population lived in Calvert, St Mary's, Prince George's, and Charles counties. By 1755, one third of Maryland's population were enslaved Africans. Slavery proved vital to Maryland's economy, with the institution providing the foundation for Maryland's economy and society. The profits from slavery also provided the means for Maryland's gentry to gain power and dominate politics.

The Brandywine people, a mixed-race group of free African American, Piscataway Indian, and white European descent, originate from the border region of Southern Maryland, specifically around the town of Brandywine.

272 slaves from across Maryland, including the Southern Maryland counties of Charles, St. Mary's, and Prince George's, were sold during the 1838 Jesuit slave sale to two planters in Louisiana.

A notable abolitionist from southern Maryland was Josiah Henson, a slave who was born in Charles County before escaping to Canada. Henson wrote an autobiography that inspired Harriet Beecher Stowe's novel, Uncle Tom's Cabin. Slavery ended in Maryland in November 1864 during the American Civil War, when Maryland ratified a new Constitution that abolished slavery.

=== The American Revolution and the War of 1812 ===
During the American Revolutionary War, British forces landed on St. George Island in St. Mary's County on July 15, 1776, under the command of John Murray, 4th Earl of Dunmore. Dunmore's forces were defeated by local Flying Camp militia led by Captain Rezin Beall, and they left the island on August 9, 1776. During the war, American slaves throughout the Chesapeake region flocked to British lines following Dunmore's Proclamation, which promised freedom for slaves who fought for the British military.

Due to Southern Maryland's proximity to the national capitol, the region was deeply affected by the War of 1812, with the war severely disrupting the lives of the region's citizens. During August and September 1814, the British launched a campaign in the Chesapeake region. British forces landed in Benedict, Charles County on August 19, 1814. Intent on marching to Washington, the British marched to Upper Marlboro before engaging American troops at the Battle of Bladensburg. The battle resulted in a British victory. By nightfall on August 24, 1814, British forces entered Washington and burned several government buildings. The British then marched back to Benedict. Similarly to what occurred in the Revolutionary War, enslaved Marylanders fled to British controlled areas to receive freedom.

=== American Civil War ===
A large portion of John Wilkes Booth's escape route following the Assassination of Abraham Lincoln runs through Southern Maryland.

During the American Civil War, wartime sympathies were divided in Maryland and Southern Maryland was sympathetic to the Confederates next to Maryland's Eastern Shore. From the war's beginning, however, large numbers of Union occupying troops and patrolling river gunboats prevented the state's secession, although frequent nighttime smuggling across the Potomac River with Virginia took place, including of Maryland men volunteering for Confederate service. John Wilkes Booth was helped by several people in his escape through the area and in crossing the river after killing President Abraham Lincoln. Thousands of captured Confederate troops were confined in harsh conditions at Point Lookout Prison Camp at the southern tip of the peninsula. During the war, in November 1863, Maryland ratified a new state Constitution which abolished slavery in the state.

=== Racial segregation and race relations ===
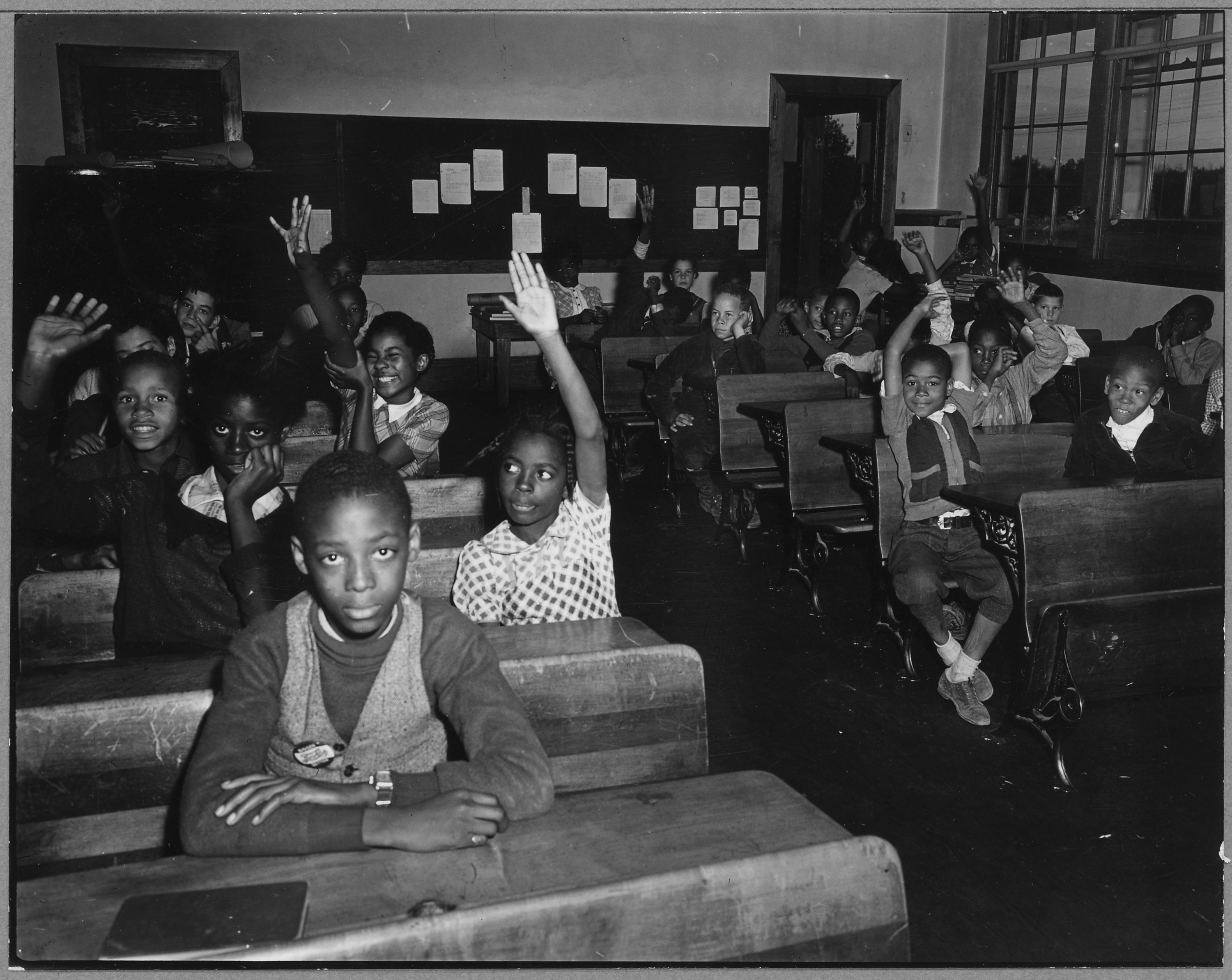
Students at an all-black one room school house in Waldorf, Maryland, 1941

Following emancipation, farms and plantations struggled without enslaved labor. Landowners turned to hiring former slaves or selling their land to former slaves. Sharecropping also became present. Southern Maryland was segregated by race, with African Americans being repressed in fields such as healthcare.

Two racial lynchings occurred in Southern Maryland. In 1886, Charles Whitley was lynched in Prince Frederick for an alleged attempted assault of a white girl. In 1887, Benjamin Hance was lynched in Leonardtown for allegedly assaulting a white woman. Additionally, an intraracial lynching occurred in Port Tobacco when British immigrant Joseph Cocking was lynched for the alleged murder of his family in 1896.

In 1911, state delegate Walter Digges and state senator William J. Frere, both of Charles County, proposed the Digges Amendment to the state constitution, which attempted to disenfranchise African American voters. The amendment was rejected during the 1911 Maryland general election.

Public schools in Southern Maryland were segregated by race. In 1937, school teacher Harriet Elizabeth Brown, with the help of NAACP attorney and future U.S. Supreme Court Justice Thurgood Marshall, successfully sued the Calvert County Public Schools system to equalize salary discrepancies between black and white school teachers. School integration took place throughout the 1950s and 1960s after the U.S. Supreme Court decision in Brown v. Board of Education. Racial tensions continued in 1969 as La Plata High School faced racial protests after no African Americans were allowed to be Majorettes.

Folk singer Bob Dylan wrote protest song "The Lonesome Death of Hattie Carroll" in response to the murder of an African American server by a white Charles County landowner in Baltimore. The landowner faced a light sentence of six months in a county jail, after being convicted of assault.

=== 20th Century ===
Southern Maryland was traditionally a rural, agricultural, oyster fishing and crabbing region; linked by passenger and freight steamboat routes. These steamboat routes operated on the Chesapeake Bay and major rivers until the 1930s before the building of highways and the Harry W. Nice Memorial Bridge on U.S. Highway 301. (The latter highway was named after Robert Crain, an attorney who owned the state's largest farm, Mount Victoria, and who campaigned for the road's construction). Weekend excursion boats also carried Washingtonians to small amusement parks and amusement pavilions at numerous Potomac shore locations. From 1949 (1943 in some places) to 1968, the region was known for its poverty and its slot machine gambling.

Following president Franklin D. Roosevelt's Executive Order 7037, which established the Rural Electrification Administration, the Southern Maryland Electric Cooperative (SMECO) was established in 1937. SMECO was established by Southern Maryland residents after the region was historically ignored by commercial power companies, and played a role in electrifying Southern Maryland.

Poverty was common in St. Mary's County in the 1960s, and gambling in the region came to be seen as a blight and was outlawed by Governor J. Millard Tawes and the state legislature. A local political figure, St. Mary's County politician J. Frank Raley Jr. organized a slate of local candidates with the platform of challenging the political status-quo and lifting the region out of its generations long poverty. Raley was falsely accused of working to end gambling outright in the region, which ended in his defeat and his official political career. In fact he had supported a referendum on gambling which would have put the decision directly in the hands of voters. He continued nevertheless lobbying on behalf of the Southern Maryland region and sitting on development boards and continued to have a major influence on economic development in the region for the rest of his life.

The region's isolation was ended by having a series of bridges built and roads expanded into highways. These developments are credited for enabling the development of modern St. Mary's County.

== Population and economy ==
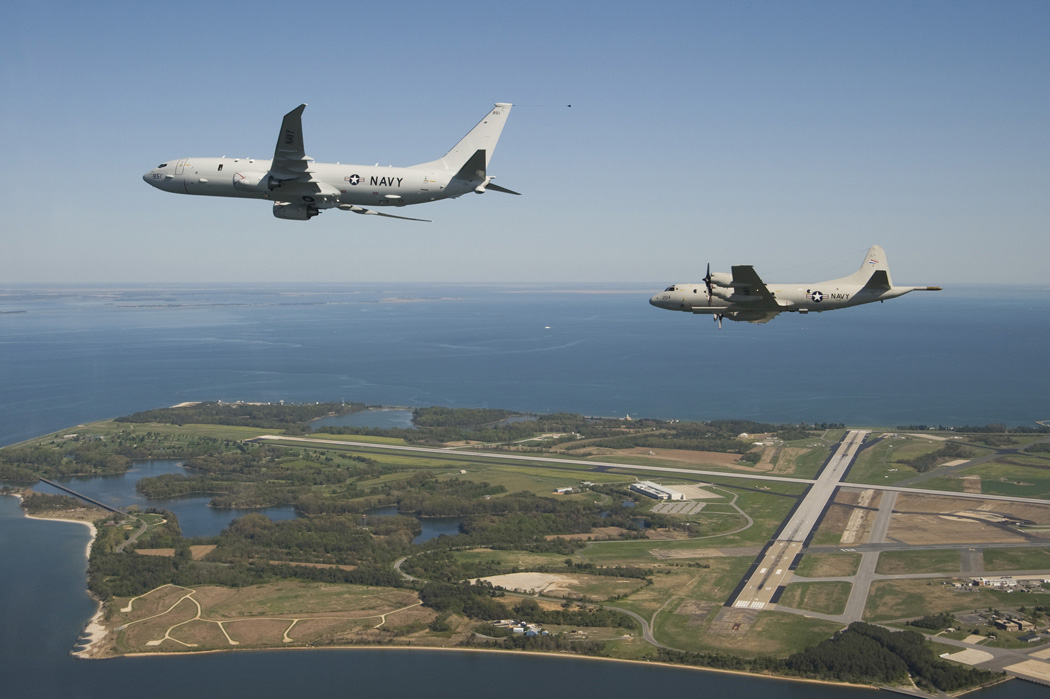
A Boeing P-8 Poseidon and Lockheed P-3 Orion over Naval Air Station Patuxent River

Since the 1980s, the region experienced suburban development as the Washington suburbs expanded southward. This expansion took place primarily in Prince George's County, and around Waldorf (a regional shopping hub) and St. Charles (a planned community in Charles County), Lexington Park (St. Mary's County) and Prince Frederick (Calvert County). Much of the area remains rural, a mixture of forest and farmland, despite suburban growth. This suburban growth has occurred and continued despite concerns from locals and environmental advocates.

Many southern Marylanders work for the United States Armed Forces or the United States Federal Government and its related industries. Other smaller industries include a nuclear power plant and a liquified natural gas terminal (both in Lusby), a Naval ordnance test ground (at Indian Head), electric power plants (at Aquasco and Morgantown) and an oil terminal (at Piney Point). The towns of Solomons Island and Chesapeake Beach are tourist resorts. The Maryland International Raceway and Budds Creek Raceway near Chaptico attract many auto and motocross racing enthusiasts.

=== Military bases ===
Military installations in Southern Maryland include:

- Patuxent River Naval Air Station, Lexington Park, St. Mary's County, home of the U.S. Naval Test Pilot School and place where the F-35 fighter aircraft was developed.
- Indian Head Naval Surface Warfare Center, Indian Head, Charles County, national munitions research and development center
- Webster Field, St. Inigoes, St. Mary's County, aircraft research and development, training field for test pilots
- Coast Guard Station St. Inigoes, St. Mary's County; public safety and rescue, law enforcement and fisheries enforcement for area waters
- The Blossom Point Research Facility is an army testing facility in southern Charles County under the leadership of the United States Army Research Laboratory in Adelphi, Maryland.

Suburban areas of Southern Maryland also have many Washington-area military related commuters.

=== Tourism ===
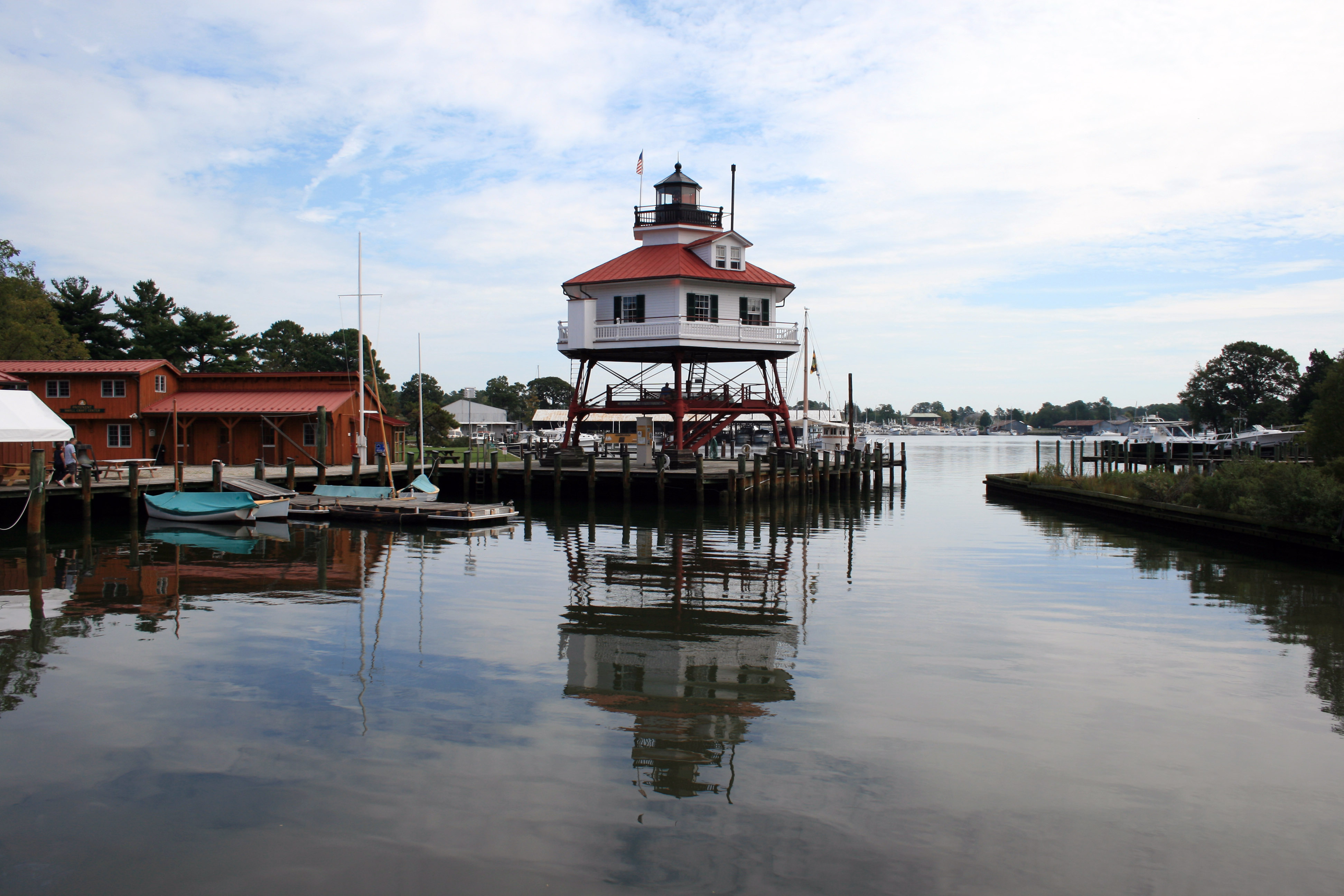
The Drum Point Lighthouse in Solomon's Island

The Southern Maryland National Heritage Area was established in the National Heritage Area Act in 2022. The National Heritage Area helps preserve and promote destinations in four counties. The National Heritage Area was officially designated in 2023.

It is also one of thirteen state heritage areas and is administered by the Maryland Historical Trust through the Maryland Heritage Areas Program.

Tourist Attractions in Southern Maryland include historical sites, such as the Thomas Stone National Historic Site, Historic St. Mary's City, and Port Tobacco Village, among others. Museums in the area include the Calvert Marine Museum, and the Patuxent River Naval Air Museum. Waterfront sites along the Chesapeake Bay, the Potomac River, and the Patuxent River are also tourist attractions. These include Mallows Bay, the Mallows Bay–Potomac River National Marine Sanctuary, and Solomon's Island.

== Food and cuisine ==
Oysters are still widely available although they were once fished from the bay and its tidal tributaries in greater numbers, and are served either fried, raw, or stuffed. "Rockfish", the Maryland word for striped bass, is considered the most prized fish dish in Southern Maryland.

Perhaps the most notable food dish originating from Southern Maryland is stuffed ham, which includes cabbage, kale, onions, spices and seasonings that are chopped and mixed, then stuffed into deep slits slashed in a whole, corned ham.

== Sports ==
Club	League	Venue	Established	Championships
Southern Maryland Blue Crabs	ALPB, Baseball	Regency Furniture Stadium	2008	0

Many residents also identify with national sports teams in Washington, D.C., or Baltimore.

== Education ==
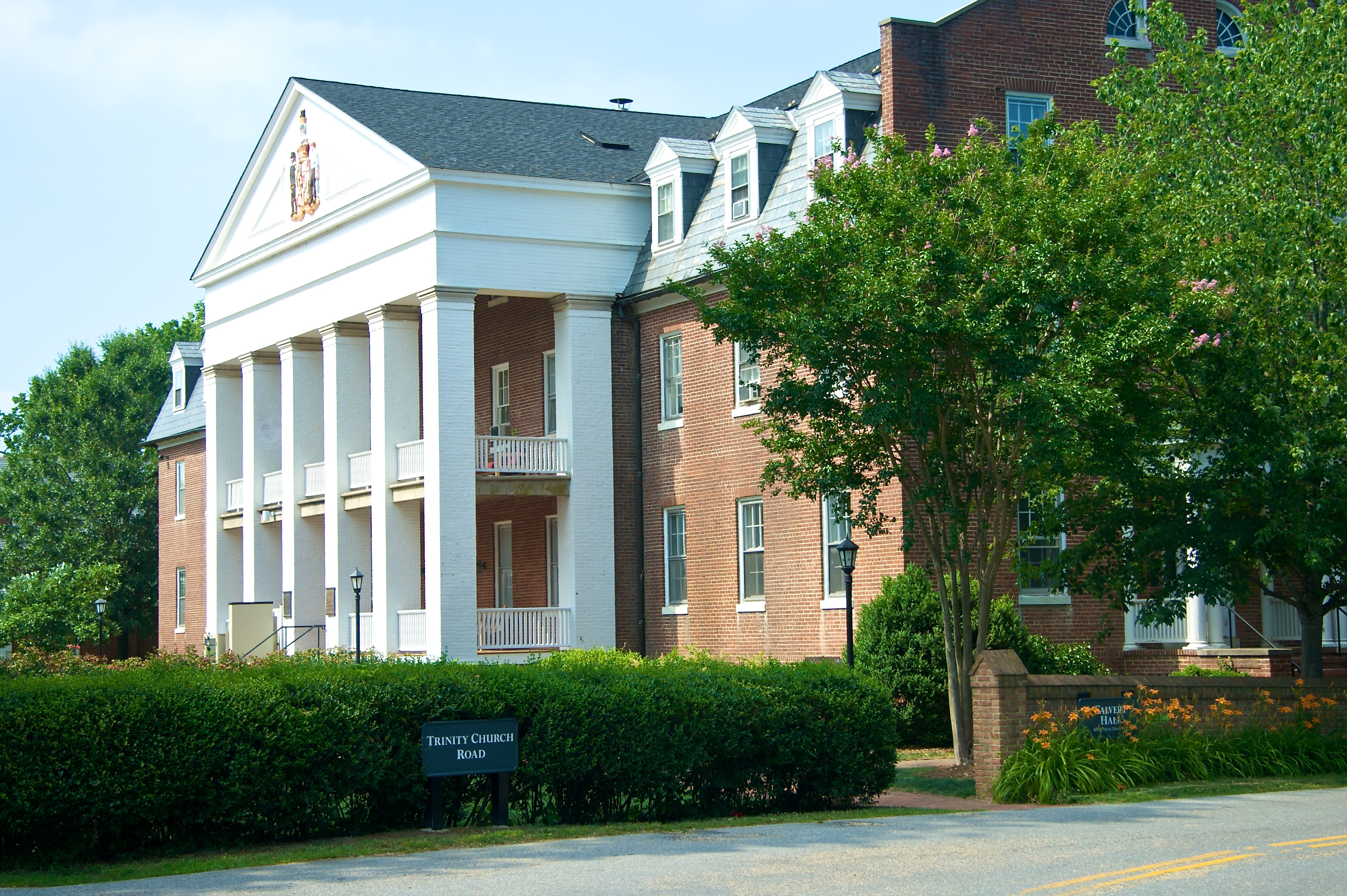
Calvert Hall located at St. Mary's College of Maryland

The area has three public school districts which serve each of Southern Maryland's three counties. The Calvert County Public Schools system operates in Calvert County, the Charles County Public Schools system in Charles County, and the St. Mary's County Public Schools system operates in St. Mary's County.

Additionally, private schools include St. Mary's Ryken High School in Leonardtown and the Calverton School in Huntingtown.

Post-secondary education facilities in Southern Maryland include:

- The College of Southern Maryland, a two-year community college with campuses in Charles, Calvert, and St. Mary's Counties
- The Paul Hall Center for Maritime Training and Education, a merchant marine educational facility in Piney Point
- St. Mary's College of Maryland, a four-year public honors college in St. Mary's County with some graduate school offerings
- The University System of Maryland in Southern Maryland, a regional center of the University System of Maryland in California

== Notable people ==
- Jerome Adams, Surgeon General of the United States
- Charles Ball, African American soldier and fugitive slave
- Margaret Brent, prominent colonist
- Harriet Elizabeth Brown, educator and civil rights activist
- Robert Crain, prominent local lawyer, namesake of Crain Highway
- Moll Dyer, woman accused of being a witch
- Bernie Fowler, Maryland State Senator and environmental advocate
- Danny Gatton, guitarist
- Louis L. Goldstein, Comptroller of Maryland
- Alfred Gough, television and film screenwriter and producer
- Scott Hall, professional wrestler
- Dashiell Hammett, author
- John Hanson, founding father
- Joseph B. Hayden, Medal of Honor recipient
- Josiah Henson, abolitionist
- Matthew Henson, Arctic explorer
- Steny Hoyer, member of the House of Representatives
- Thomas Johnson, governor of Maryland and Associate Justice of the Supreme Court of the United States
- Mary Kittamaquund, a Piscataway who helped to establish relations between Natives and English colonists
- Joel and Benji Madden, musicians from the band Good Charlotte
- Christina Milian, singer
- Dr. Samuel Mudd, doctor
- Captain Raphael Semmes, captain of the CSS Alabama
- William Smallwood, general
- Robert Stethem, US Navy diver and murder victim during the hijacking of TWA Flight 847
- Benjamin Stoddert, first United States Secretary of the Navy
- Thomas Stone, founding father
- Arthur Storer, astronomer
- Mathias de Sousa, first African-American to vote in an American legislature
- Roger B. Taney, Chief Justice of the United States
- Turkey Tayac, Piscataway tribal leader and herbal medicine man
- Margaret Mackall Smith Taylor, First Lady of the United States under Zachary Taylor
- Dr. Robert Ulanowicz, theoretical ecologist

== See also ==
- Bugeye
- Tidewater (region)
- Skipjack (boat)
- Southern Maryland Delegation
- Southern Maryland Rapid Transit
- Southern Maryland Athletic Conference
- Southern Maryland Electric Cooperative
- Southern Maryland Railroad
- Southern Maryland Roller Derby
- Timeline of Southern Maryland
