= Urey Woodson =

American newspaper editor (1859–1939)

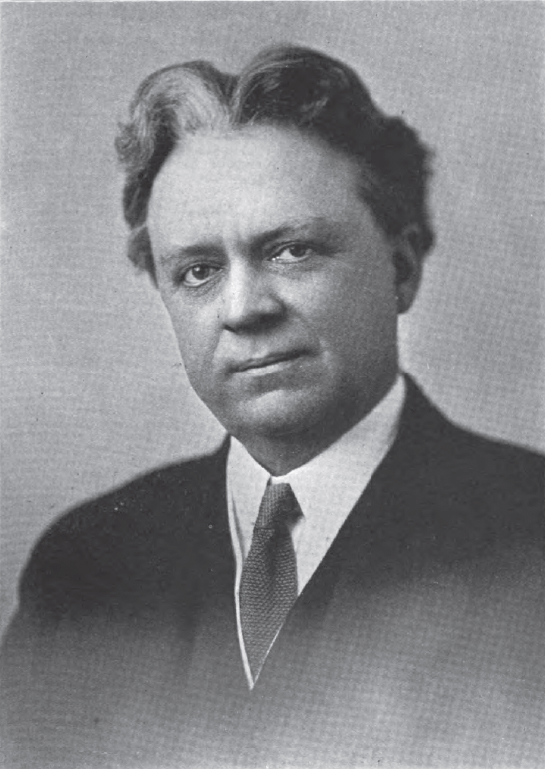
- Woodson, c. 1922
- Born: August 16, 1859; Madisonville, Kentucky
- Died: August 7, 1939 (aged 79); Owensboro, Kentucky
- Occupation: Newspaper editor

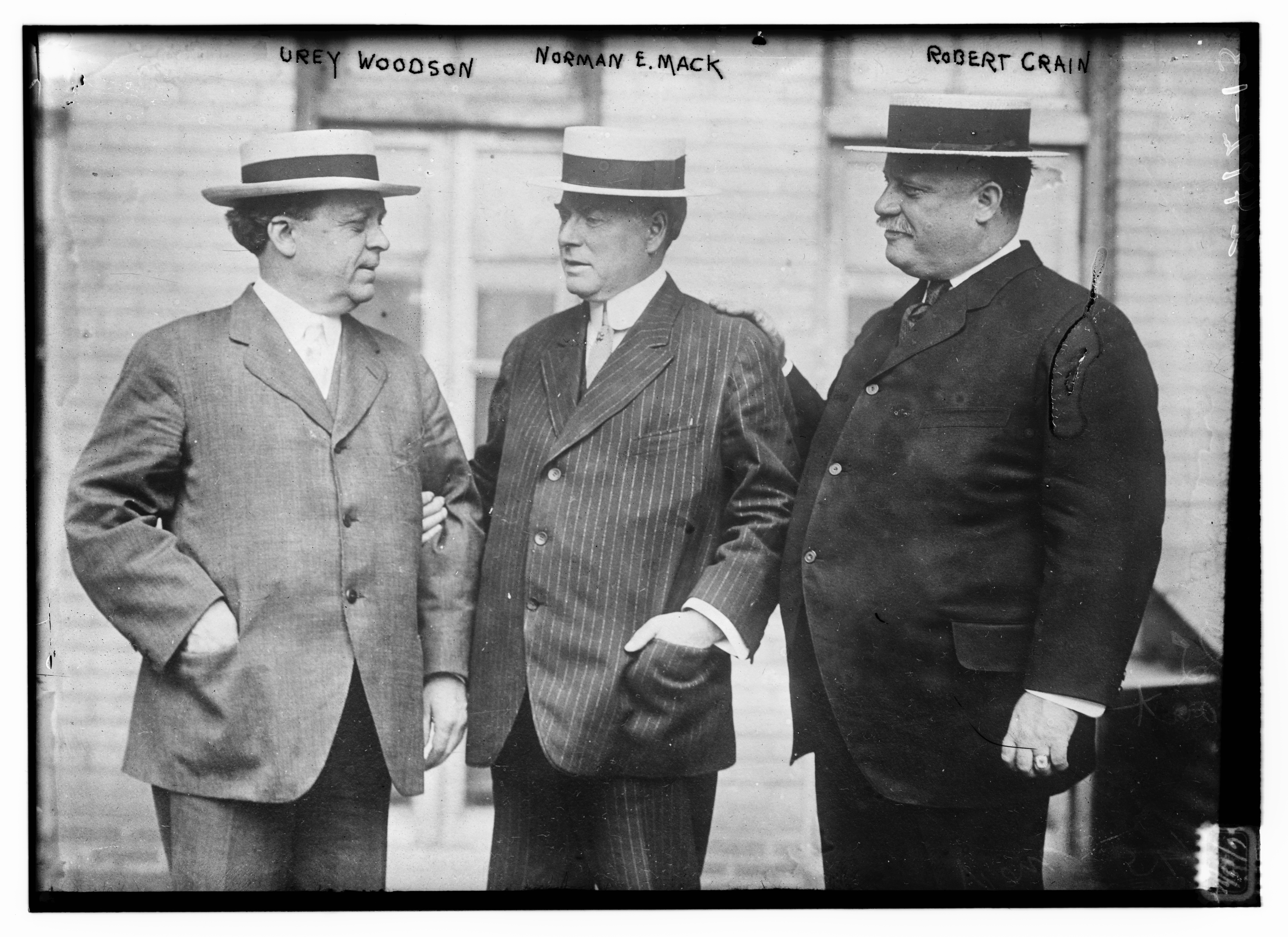
Urey Woodson, Norman Edward Mack, and Robert Crain at the 1912 Democratic National Convention in Baltimore

Urey Woodson (August 16, 1859 - August 7, 1939) was a Kentucky Democrat and a newspaper editor and publisher.

== Biography ==
He was the Kentucky railroad commissioner from 1891 to 1895. He was a member of Democratic National Committee from Kentucky from 1896 to 1912, from 1916 to 1918, and from 1924 to 1928. He was a delegate to the Democratic National Convention from Kentucky in 1932. A Presbyterian, he died on August 7, 1939, and was buried in Elmwood Cemetery in Owensboro, Kentucky.
