= Robert Crain =

American landowner and lawyer

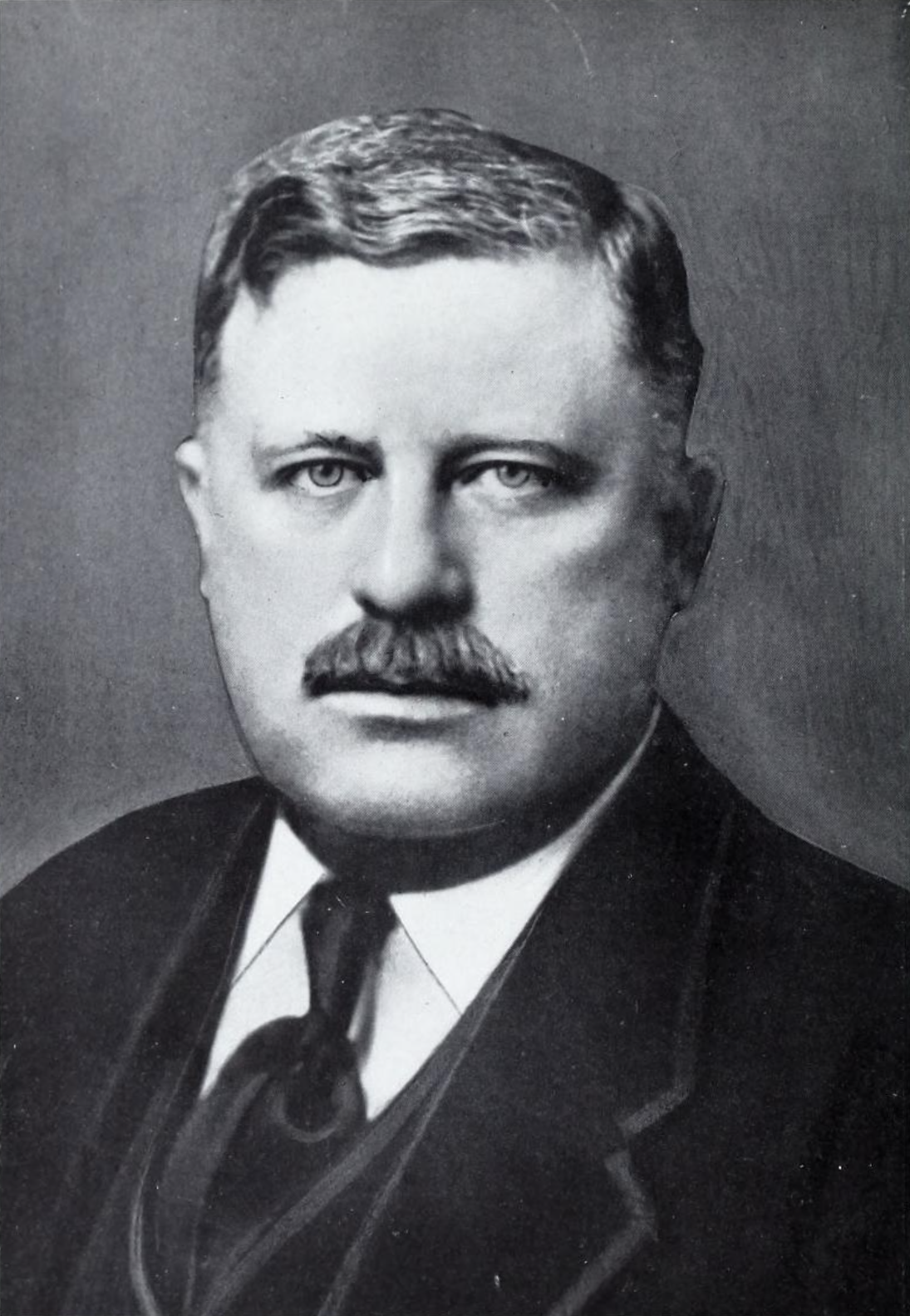
- Crain in 1914 publication
- Born: Robert S. Crain; February 12, 1865; Mount Victoria, Maryland, U.S.
- Died: August 26, 1928 (aged 63); Washington, D.C., U.S.
- Resting place: Crain Cemetery; Mount Victoria, Maryland, U.S.
- Education: Charlotte Hall Military Academy; St. John's College; University of Maryland School of Law (LLB)
- Occupations: Lawyer; farmer
- Known for: namesake of Crain Highway
- Political party: Democratic
- Spouse: Margaret Bennett
- Children: 4

Robert S. Crain (February 12, 1865 – August 26, 1928) was a lawyer and farmer from Maryland who was active with the Democratic Party. He was the namesake of the Crain Highway.

== Early life ==
Robert S. Crain was born on February 12, 1865, at the Crain estate in Mount Victoria, Charles County, Maryland, to Nellie (née Morgan) and Robert Crain. He attended Charlotte Hall Military Academy and St. John's College. He graduated from University of Maryland School of Law in 1886 with a Bachelor of Laws.

== Career ==
Crain was a farmer and breeder of shorthorn cattle in Charles County. By 1920, he expanded his farm to be 10,000 acres (4,000 ha). He also worked as a lawyer in Baltimore and Washington, D.C. Soon after graduating, Crain started a law partnership with Omer F. Hershey known as Crain & Hershey. Their practice was located at Calvart Building in Baltimore and continued until October 1, 1916. He served as legal counsel for the United States Brewers' Association against Prohibition for more than 20 years. He also represented Pennsylvania Railroad, Chesapeake and Potomac Telephone Company and United Railways of Baltimore.

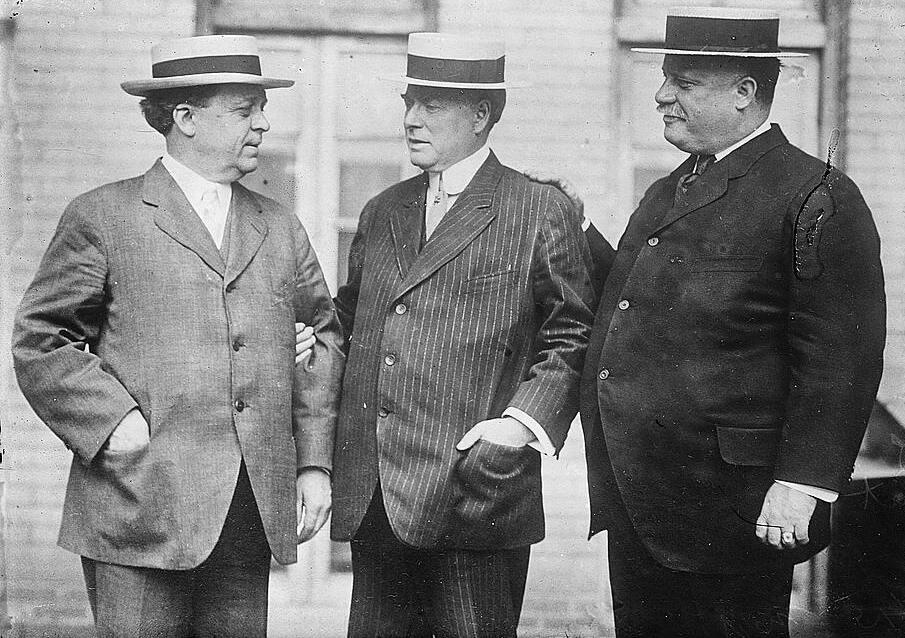
Urey Woodson, Norman E. Mack and Crain at the 1912 Democratic National Convention

Crain was a Democrat and fundraiser for the Democratic Party. He did not run for public office. He managed the Maryland gubernatorial campaign of Frank Brown. He was appointed as liquor license commissioner by Governor Brown. He served as a delegate at the 1888 Democratic National Convention in St. Louis, delegate-at-large at the 1920 Democratic National Convention and a delegate at the 1924 Democratic National Convention. Crain helped secure Baltimore as the site of the 1912 Democratic National Convention.

Crain advocated for state funding for a road between Baltimore and Southern Maryland. His efforts were successful and the Crain Highway, a 33-mile highway, was completed in October 1927. Crain served as the supervisor of elections and as a member of the excise board of Baltimore.

Crain was appointed as trustee of the Maryland Agricultural College (later the University of Maryland) by Governor Edwin Warfield. He served in that role until his death. He served as chairman of reorganization and was successful in advocating for legislation to create the State Board of Agriculture, which aligned the college and state under one organized body.

== Personal life ==
Crain married Margaret Bennett, daughter of William G. Bennett, a judge from West Virginia. They had two sons and two daughters, Robert Jr., William George, Eleanor Morgan and Margaret Bennett. He was a member of the Protestant Episcopal Church. Crain was friends with John W. Davis and Davis was godfather to Crain's daughter. He was also friends with Governor Albert Ritchie.

Crain lived at the family's estate in Mount Victoria. Later in life, Crain lived at 1855 Wyoming Avenue in Washington, D.C. Crain bought Cobb Island and organized the Cobb Island Development Company. In 1922 and 1923, the company constructed roads, a summer resort and a bridge to the island.

Crain died on August 26, 1928, at Garfield Hospital in Washington, D.C. He was temporarily interred at Prospect Hill Cemetery and was later interred at the Crain Cemetery at the Crain Farm in Mount Victoria.

== Legacy ==
The Robert Crain Highway Monument is a monument to the highway that Crain helped establish.
