= Mount Victoria, Maryland =

Unincorporated community in Maryland, United States

- Unincorporated community
- Location within the state of Maryland Mount Victoria (the United States)
- Coordinates: 38°21′12″N 76°53′45″W
- Country: United States
- State: Maryland
- County: Charles
- Time zone: UTC-5 (Eastern (EST))
  - Summer (DST): UTC-4 (EDT)
- ZIP code: 20661
- GNIS feature ID: 590846

Mount Victoria is an unincorporated community in southern Charles County, Maryland, United States, between the Wicomico and Potomac Rivers. It was named for an enormous farm of 15,000 acres (61 km^{2}) owned by Robert Crain, an attorney and farmer whose lobbying efforts led to the opening in 1927 of the Maryland portion of U.S. Highway 301. This farm was said at the time to be the largest private landholding in Maryland.
