= Drum Point Light =

Lighthouse in Maryland, United States

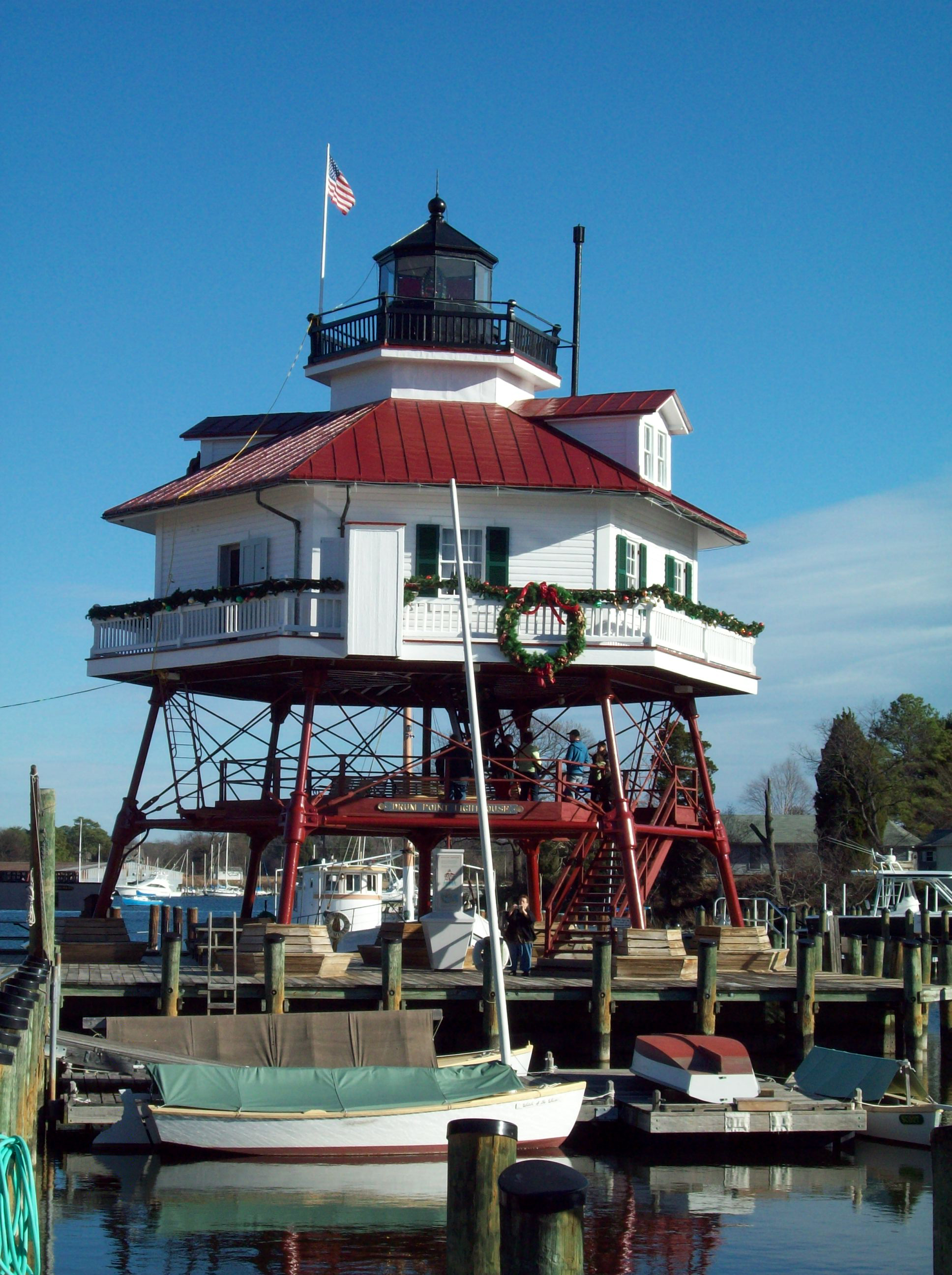
- Drum Point Light, Calvert Marine Museum, December 2008
- Location: originally off Drum Point at the mouth of the Patuxent River in the Chesapeake Bay; relocated to the Calvert Marine Museum
- Coordinates: 38.319°N 76.421°W (approximate original); 38.331°N 76.463°W (current)

Tower
- Foundation: screw-pile
- Construction: cast-iron/wood
- Automated: 1960
- Height: 46 feet (14 m)
- Shape: hexagonal house
- Heritage: National Register of Historic Places listed place

Light
- First lit: August 20, 1883
- Deactivated: September 6, 1962
- Lens: fourth-order Fresnel lens
- Range: 13 nautical miles (24 km; 15 mi)
- Drum Point Lighthouse
- U.S. National Register of Historic Places
- Area: less than one acre
- NRHP reference No.: 73000910
- Added to NRHP: April 11, 1973

Drum Point Light Station also known as Drum Point Lighthouse is one of four surviving Chesapeake Bay screw-pile lighthouses. Originally located off Drum Point at the mouth of the Patuxent River, Maryland, United States, it is now an exhibit at the Calvert Marine Museum.

== History ==
=== Planning ===
In 1853, a report was filed by Lieutenant A. M. Pennock working for the United States Lighthouse Board. His survey mentioned that "a small light should be placed on Drum Point, inside of the Patuxent River." During storms, vessels would shelter there and several vessels had "brought up on the spit."

On August 3, 1854, following that report, $5,000 were appropriated by Congress to build "a light-house on Drum Point, entrance of Patuxent River.". However, it was not used to build the project for 18 years. In spite of subsequent requests by steamship operators, further funding did not come until August 1882. On August 7, 1882, Congress appropriated $25,000 for the "establishment of two range lights at the mouth of the Patuxent River." The funds were not adequate for such a project, and it was never seriously considered for execution. The Lighthouse Service, due to the "smallness of the appropriation" decided to build a lighthouse as originally planned in 1854. A 5-acre (2.0 ha) offshore lot was obtained.

=== Construction ===
==== Building ====
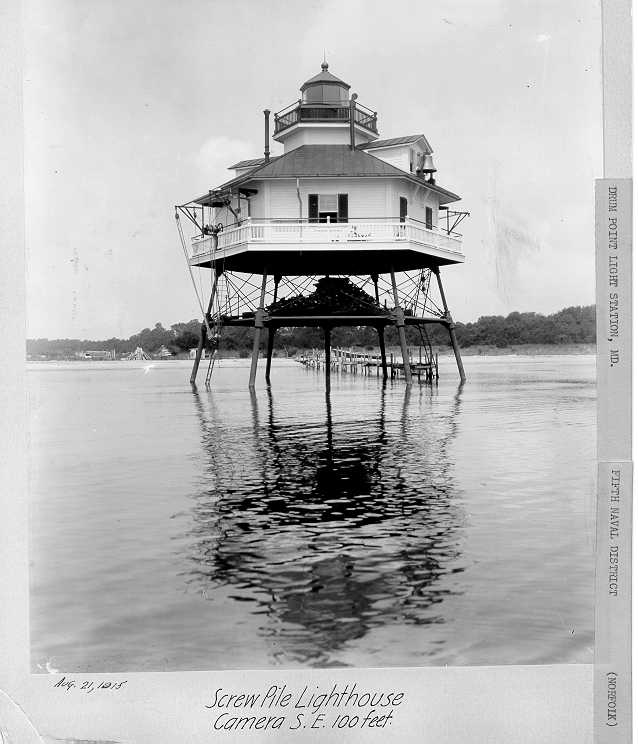
View of Drum Point Light in 1915 with view of the bell

A screw-pile lighthouse design was selected by the board. Work started on July 17, 1883. The 10-inch-diameter, wrought-iron piles were made by the Allentown Rolling Mills of Philadelphia and fitted with three-foot-wide auger flanges. Once on site, the seven piles were hand bored into the bottom of the river. This part of the operation was completed by July 24, 1883.

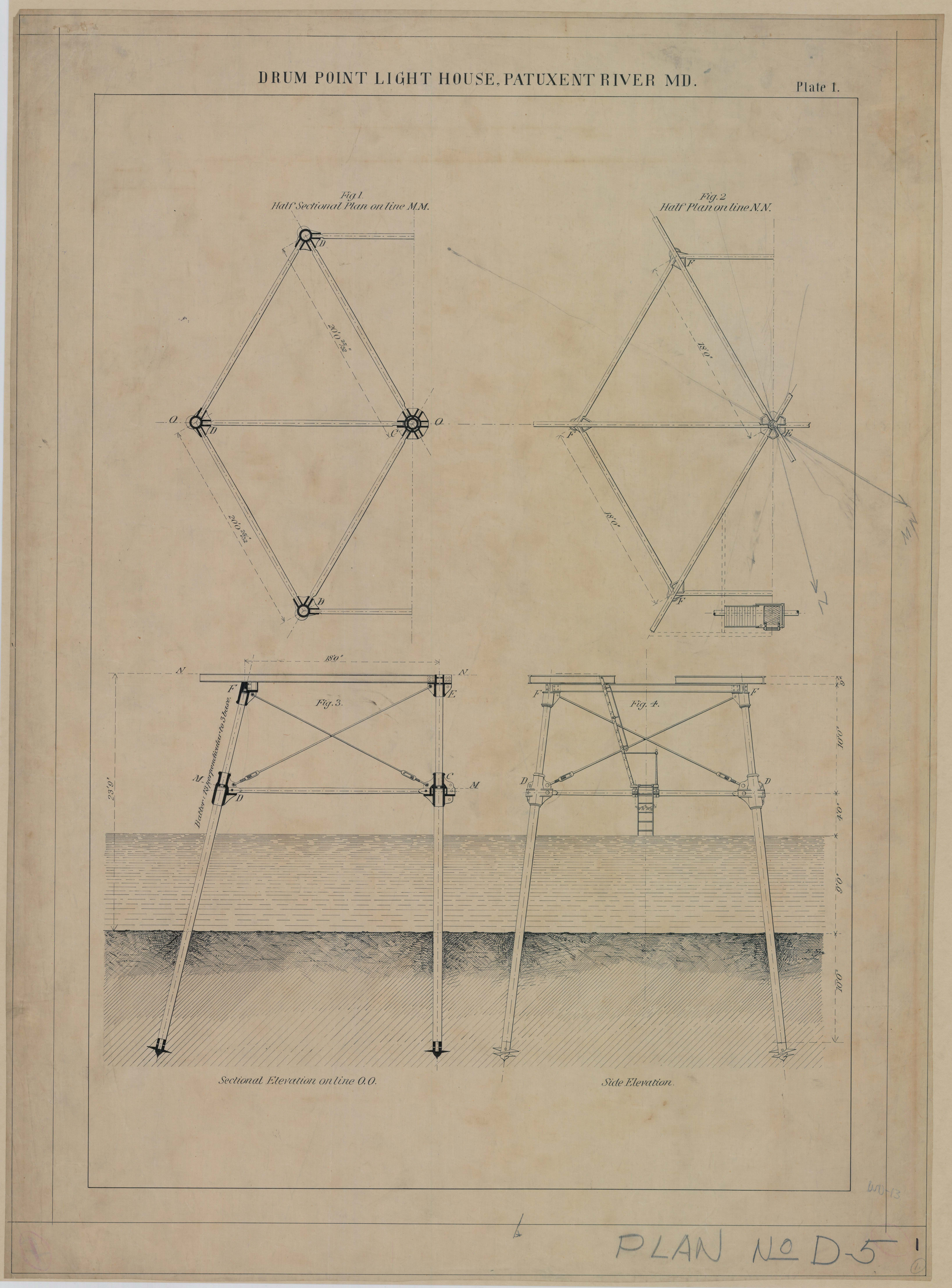
Sectional of the pile

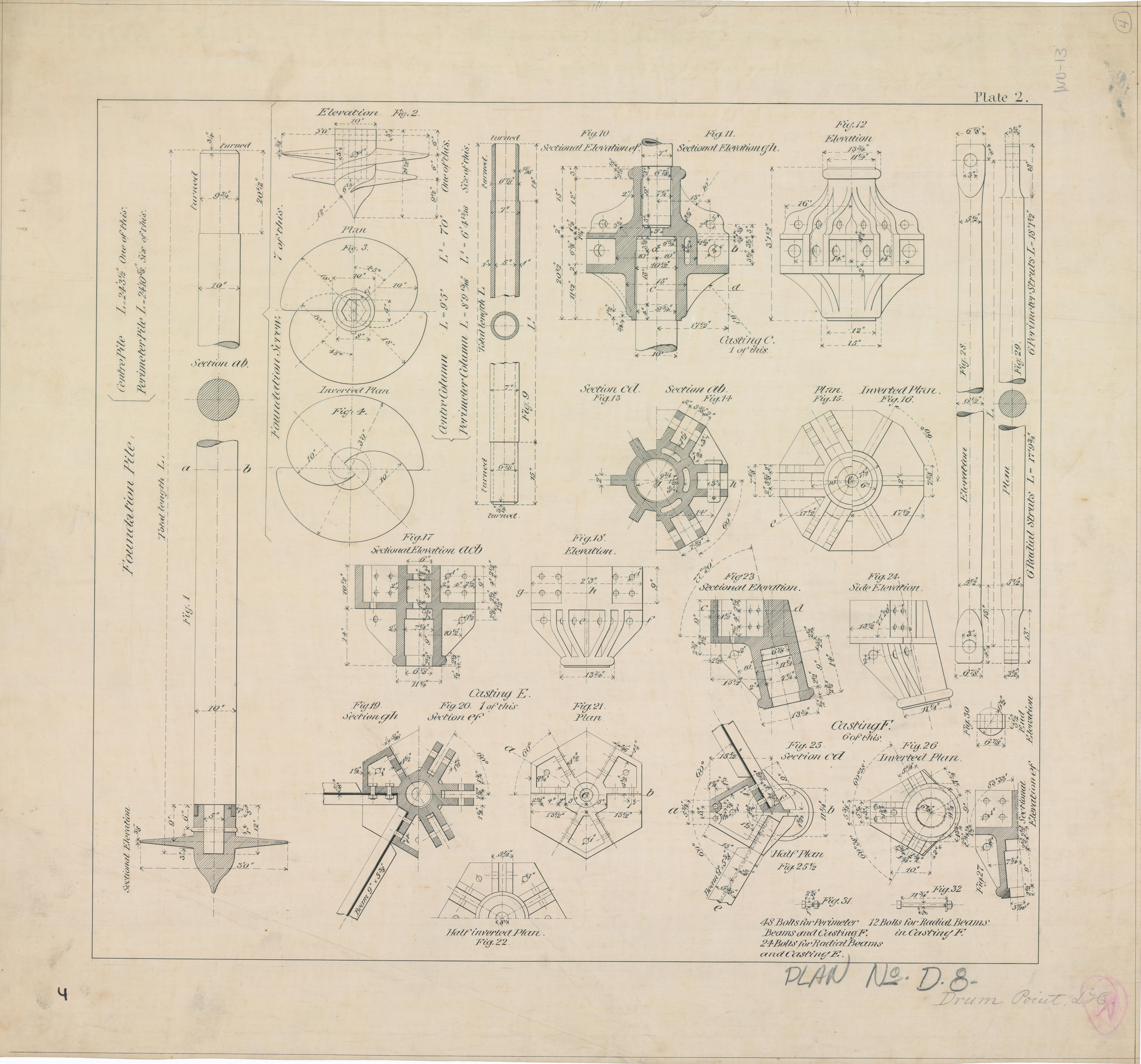
Foundation pile and castings

The house or "cottage" itself was then assembled. It had six sides, and stood one-and-a-half-story tall. Made of wood, it had mortised and tenoned joints. To protect it from the elements, it was sheathed with weatherboards. The exterior walls were painted white, while the metal roof and pilings were painted red.

On the main floor, it was divided in four rooms of roughly the same size:

- Sitting room
- Keeper's bedroom
- Dining room
- Kitchen

For ventilation and light, two doors and six windows opened outward on a gallery surrounding the structure from which two iron ladders went down to the water's edge.

A central spiral staircase near the sitting room allowed access to the second floor, where were located:

- Assistant keeper's room
- Bell room (located as far as possible from the keeper's room)

A flight of stairs led to the lantern room, where the lens was housed.

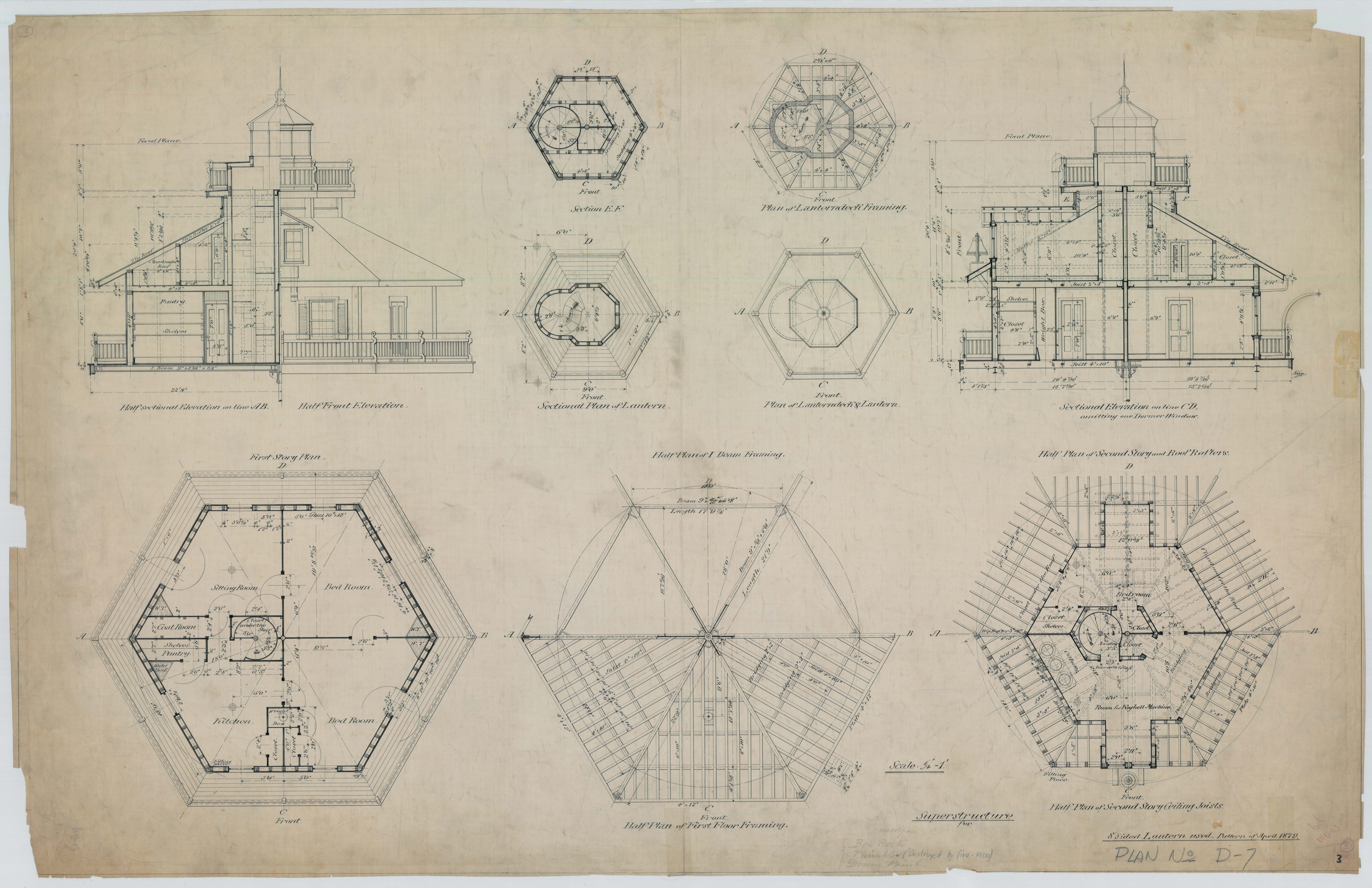
First-story plan, second story and roof rafters plan

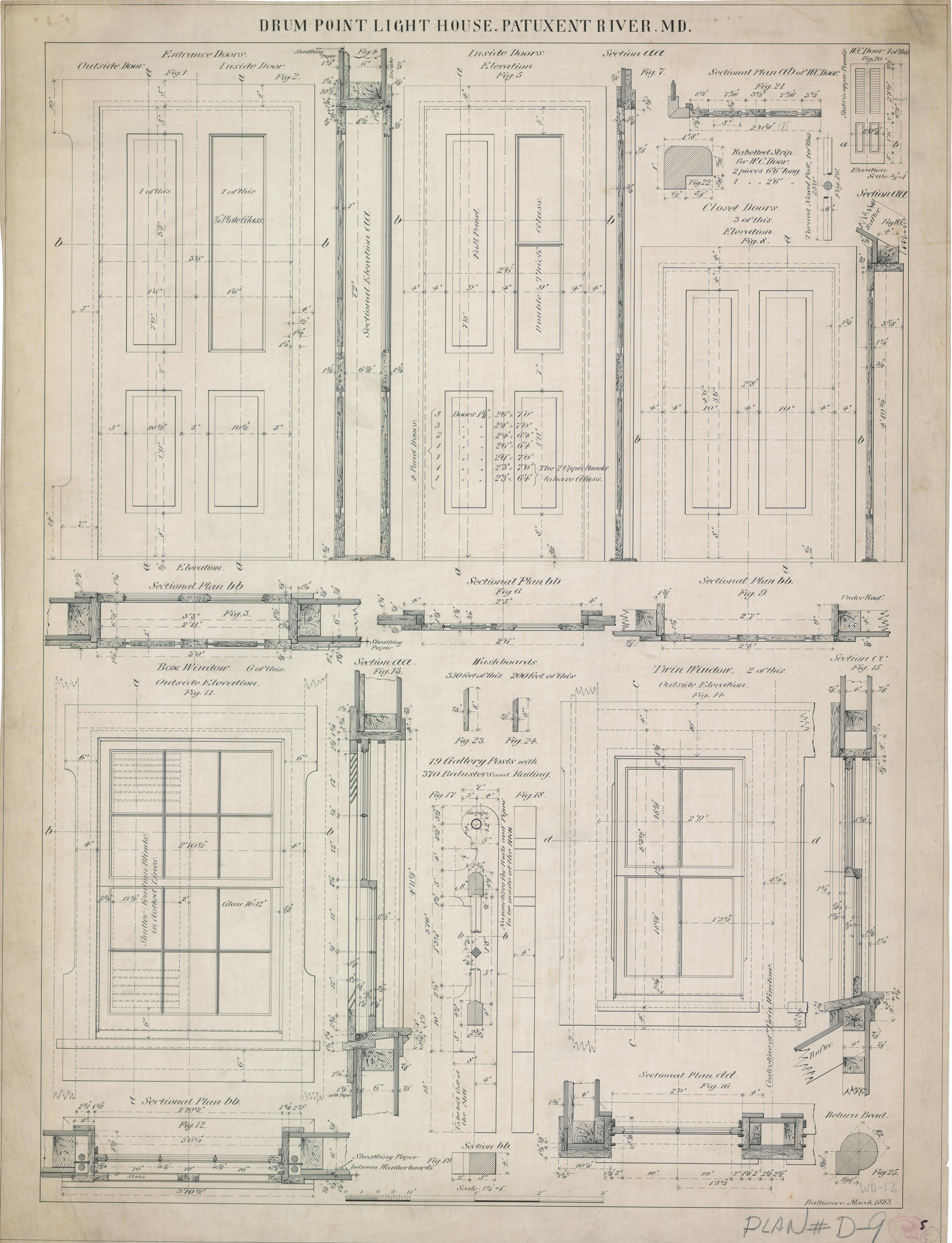
Entrance doors, inside doors, closet doors, and windows

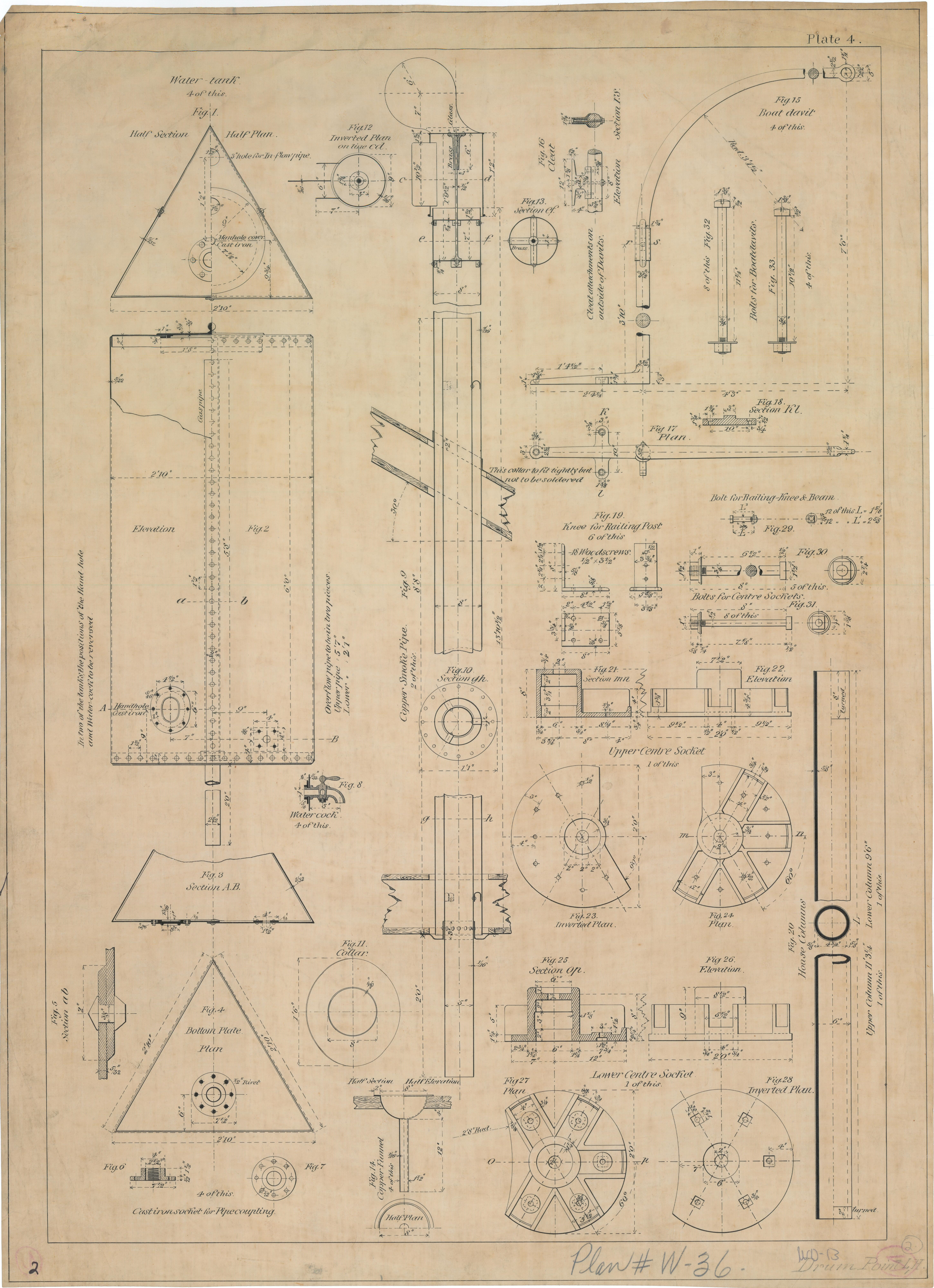
Water tank, boat davit

The prefabrication and the 10-foot depth of water allowed for the lighthouse to be built for only $5,000 as per the appropriation of 1853 and in only 33 days.

==== Lens ====
The Fresnel lens used was made by Henry Le Paute of Paris at a cost of $1,200. It used a fourth-order Fresnel lens with prisms covering the 270° needed to cover the area of water. The focal plane of the beam was 47 ft above the water. On a clear night, it could be seen 13 nautical miles (24 km; 15 mi) from the deck of a vessel 15 ft above the sea.

The light was originally a red light produced with a red chimney placed over the lamp. Due to its location on land, it only needed to be 270° of width as the remaining 90° were of land. At some point after 1909, the red chimney was replaced by a white one with three sheets of ruby red glass attached to the lantern room storm panes (windows). With the three red sectors, a vessel approaching the light could navigate the entrance of Patuxent River by staying in the white sectors of light. The light did not rotate or blink and was a steady beam.

==== Bell ====
The bell weighed 1,400 lb. It was embossed with its maker: "McShane Bell Foundry, Henry McShane and Co., Baltimore, Maryland, 1880."

It was sounded with "2 blows at intervals of 15 seconds during thick and foggy weather." The responsibility of ringing the bell fell on the assistant lightkeeper, who happened to have the room closest to the bell. According to an eyewitness, foxes would come to the beach to bark at the bell on foggy nights.

=== Operation ===
The light was commissioned on August 20, 1883, when the first lightkeeper, Benjamin Gray, lit the light for the first time.

Lightkeepers were provided with a copy of Instructions to Light-Keepers, as well as other publications. The instructions provided detailed instructions on how to operate the lighthouse and what was allowed to be had in the lighthouse. It declared that "articles known as luxurious are forbidden to be provided." According to John Hanson, Drum Point lightkeeper between 1942 and 1960, the U.S. Lighthouse Service only replaced the bristles on paint brushes and handles had to be reused, while old rags and the brass bases of light bulbs had to be exchanged to receive replacements.

A telephone was requested in 1919 by the keeper. After much correspondence and the keeper even offering to pay for it out of his own money, the service allowed a telephone to be installed in 1923. However, it was to be listed under Drum Point Lighthouse and not be used by the keeper for his "convenience".

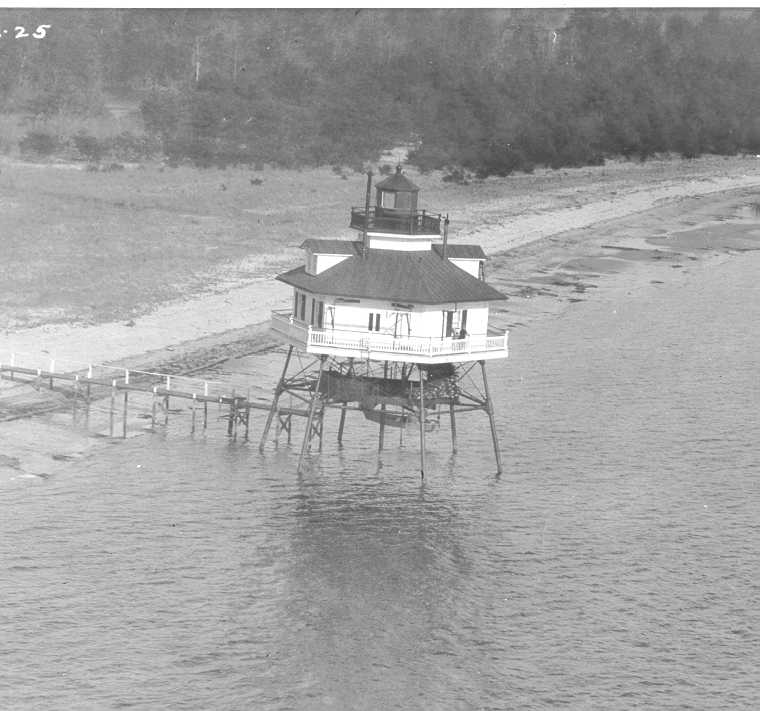
Aerial view of Drum Point Light

A privy on the edge of the gallery walkway was the only sanitary facilities on premises for some time. Later on, a bathroom was added to the main floor and sanitary facilities were installed probably in the 1950s. Fresh water was collected from rainwater with pipes on the roof. It was then collected in four 200-gallon cisterns in the cottage. If this was insufficient, more water could be had by walking to the Barreda House on a hill, one mile inland using buckets. Clothes were washed in saltwater.

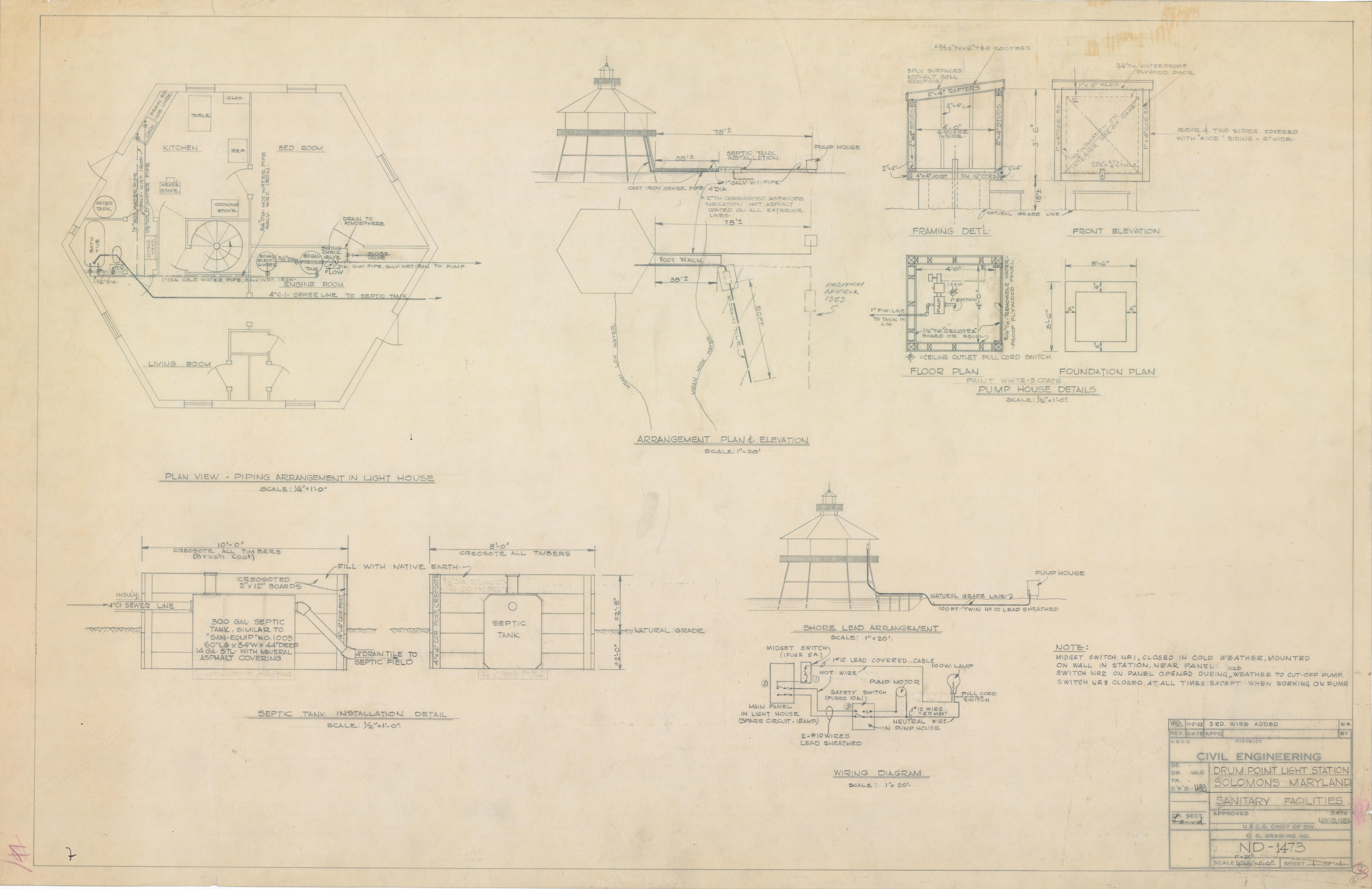
Sanitary facilities plan from 1951

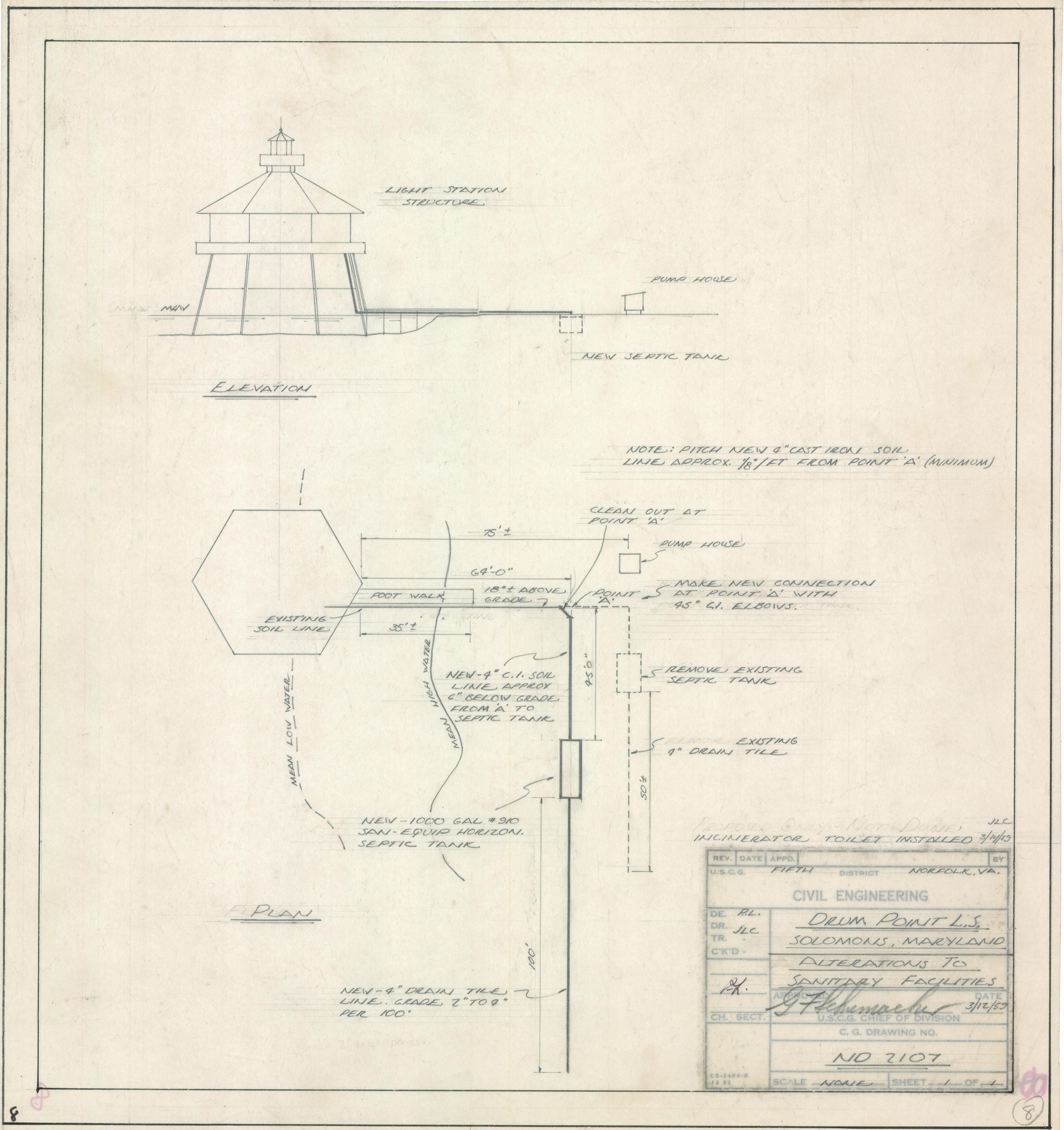
Alteration plan to the sanitary facilities from 1959

The risk of fire was extremely high due to the structure being made primarily of wood and the presence of a large quantity of oil used for the lighting of the lamps, cooking, and heating. In 1932, the oil lamp was changed to an incandescent oil vapor lamp to increase the power and range. It was later converted to electricity. Storms were also another source of danger. Unlike many such lights, Drum Point escaped ice damage.On August 23, 1933, though, the seas were reportedly "at least 15 feet high", flooding all the rooms on the lower deck, leading to significant damage and sinking the lighthouse's small boat.

Birds were an issue as at other lighthouses. They were attracted to the light and sometimes crashed in the glass storm panels. This was even more a problem during spring and fall migrations and extra panes of glass were stored in the lighthouse to replace damaged panes.

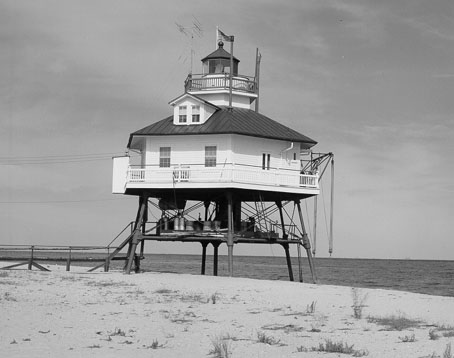
Drum Point Light sanded in

The light was converted to electricity in 1944. This made life easier for the keeper, but also led to the disappearance of the keeper, as it did not need supervision overnight to make sure it stayed on. The U.S. Lighthouse Service was transferred to the United States Coast Guard in 1939 and the lighthouse was one of the first to be automated in 1960 as part of a formal program of automating lighthouses.

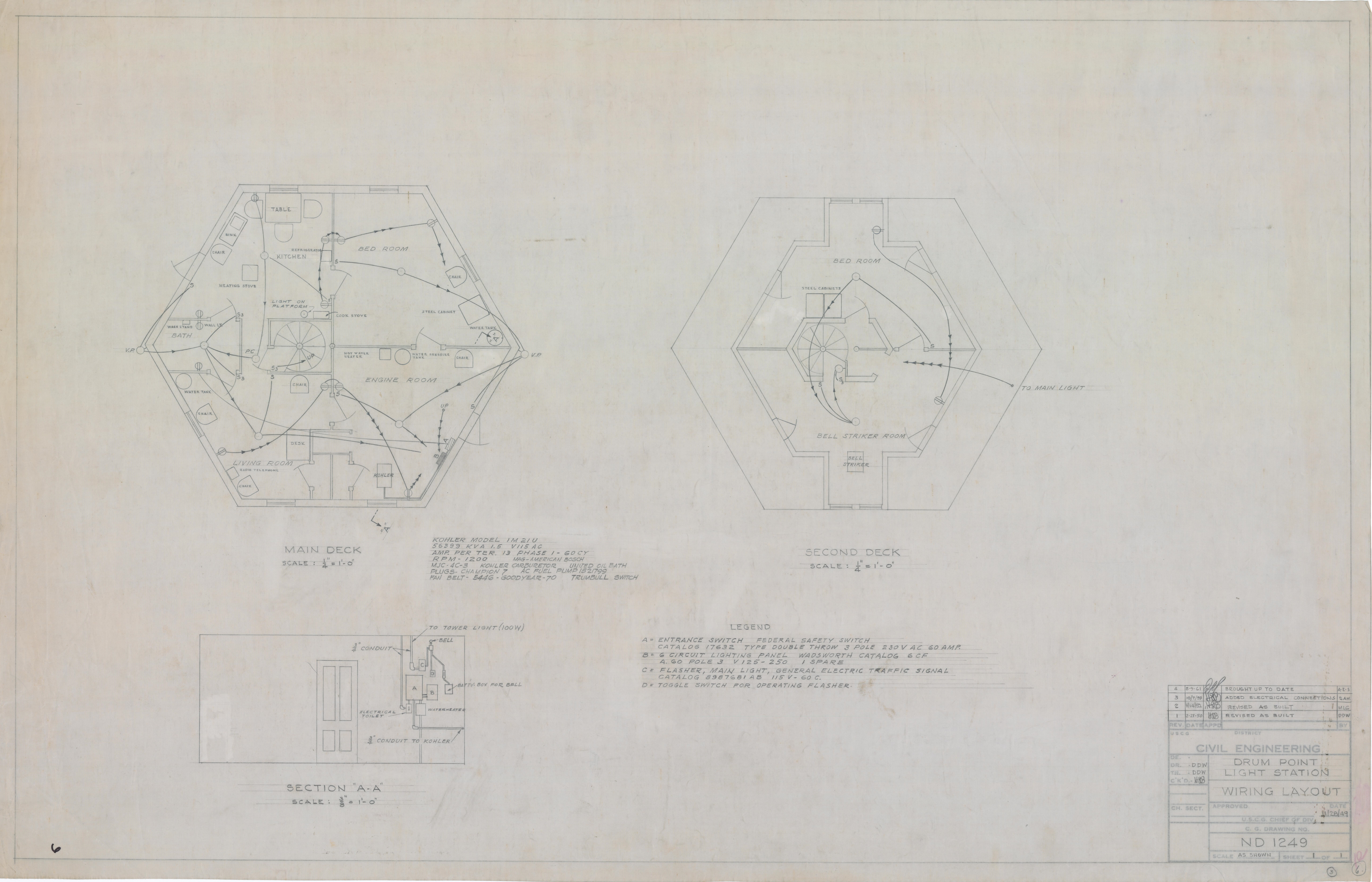
Wiring layout from 1949

The light originally stood in 10 feet of water. The light was needed in the first place because of the considerable shoaling around the point. This gradually shifted the shoreline to the point where the light was entirely on land by the 1970s.

=== Decommission and transfer of ownership ===
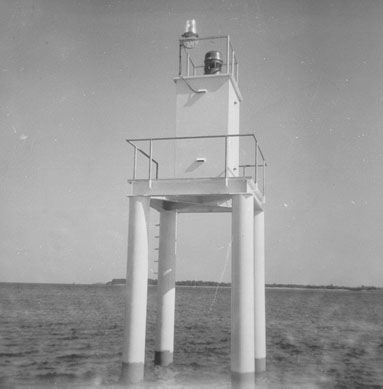
Drum Point Fixed Offshore light

After 79 years of service, the light was decommissioned on September 6, 1962. It was replaced first by a lighted buoy, and later by a fixed offshore light. Unlike other such conversions, however, the house was not torn down, but simply abandoned. The station was turned over to the State. It was left abandoned for the elements and vandals to damage it further. The state had plans to restore it and open access to the public, but while the structure was the property of the State, the land needed to access it was still owned by the General Services Administration, which administered it on behalf of the federal government. In addition, the access property was blocked by several miles of private property.

The Calvert County Historical Society attempted to acquire the light as early as 1966 as a special project, but had to navigate the state and federal bureaucracy. It was added to the National Register of Historical Places on April 11, 1973, to protect it. In 1974, the society was informed that it could have the Drum Point Lighthouse, but not the land underneath it. With the help of the Calvert County government, the property was transferred on December 10, 1974. By then, extensive damage had been done. It had been set on fire, an attempt had been made to steal the bell, the brass lens stand had been stolen, and doors had been ripped from their hinges.

=== Move ===
With a $25,000 grant from the State of Maryland, a contract was signed to move the lighthouse in one piece 2 nautical miles upriver to a new waterfront location accessible to the public at the Calvert Marine Museum, which had opened in 1970. The B.F. Diamond Construction Company from Savannah, Georgia, was constructing a bridge over the Patuxent River near Solomons at the time and a contract was signed to move the structure.

A new foundation was prepared, with work starting in February 1975. Due to the weather, construction was delayed by a month. Finally, in March 1975, the move could begin. The area had to be "backwashed" with the tugboat to create a channel to access the now-landlocked lighthouse. The cutting of the piles started, using torches. The piles were found to be made of solid steel and not hollow as previously thought. This further delayed the move, as two days were needed to cut through the metal, forcing the barge and tugboat to go back to Solomons for the night.

They returned the next day. With the use of a barge with a steam-operated crane, a square structure made of I-beams spreading cables was lowered on the lighthouse with only inches to spare from the roof. The cables were attached to the metal structure under the cottage and the final piles cut. The structure was raised under the eyes of people present, including John Hansen, a former keeper. Two tugboats were used to pull the barge holding the 41-ton structure suspended. The trip took only 30 minutes, as the lighthouse was moved to its new location, where is stands today.

The restoration was aided by funds from the National Park Service and the Maryland Historical Trust for the exterior and the structure. The interior was completely restored using period furniture under the advisory of Anna Weems Ewalt born in 1906 in the cottage. Along with a team of friends and volunteers, she went throughout the region looking for authentic furniture, often donated by Calvert County residents. She donated her grandmother's china set that was used at the time in the lighthouse along with Mr Hansen's original chair. The original lens is on display at the museum.

The Drum Point Lighthouse was rededicated as an exhibit on June 24, 1978, with Governor Blair Lee III in attendance.

The complete logbooks from 1883 to 1943 survive, providing detailed records of a lighthouse keeper's routine and operations.

== Lightkeepers ==
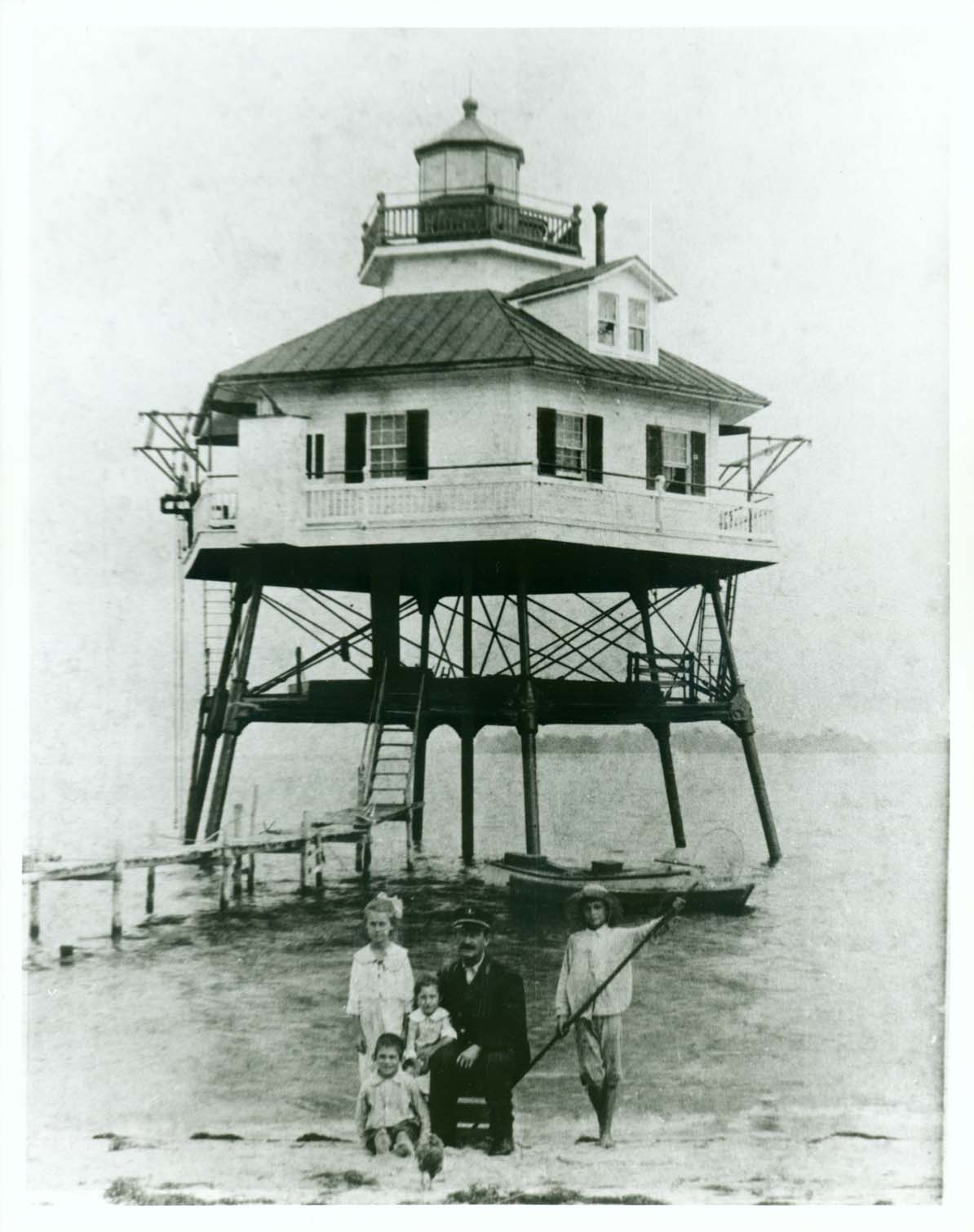
Drum Point Lighthouse in September 1918 with the lightkeeper (William Yeatman), his family, and a chicken

The life of a keeper at Drum Point was lonely and monotonous. It involved painting, cleaning, and general upkeep. A keeper admitted he used the lower gallery walkway to run around as a way to break the monotony, while another one, William Yeatman, who lived with his wife and daughter, would salute all passing boats with three rings of the bell. Fortunately, the Drum Point Lighthouse was located only two nautical miles from Solomons for supplies. Some keepers planted vegetable gardens on the nearby point, and at least one keeper kept chickens for eggs.

Keepers sometimes had families. Wives and children lived in the station. Wives acted as assistant keeper and were not paid by the service, saving on cost according to the report of a district inspector. Two children were born at the lighthouse: Anna Weems Ewalt in July 1906 and Everett Yeatman around 1918. Two children died at the lighthouse and their caskets were lowered into boats from the station and taken to the Solomons wharf. At the turn of the 20th century, a small bridge was constructed from the light to the shore (as visible in the pictures below), allowing the keeper's family to live with him in the light.

Drum Point Lighthouse Keepers
Dates	Keeper	Yearly salary (start - finish)
August 16, 1883 - October 27, 1890	Benjamin Gray	$540 - $575
October 27, 1890 - October 1, 1891	William A. Bareford	$575
October 1, 1891 - April 30, 1918	James Locke Weems	$575
December 15, 1917 - November 30, 1918	James A. Dowell (Assistant Keeper)	$300
1918	William Yeatman	$780
1919 - 1922	Henry C. Wingate	$780
July 25, 1922 - October 29, 1924	Cale B. Stowe	$960
October 29, 1924 - November 2, 1925	unknown	unknown
November 2, 1925 - July 30, 1929	James L. Lewis	$1,440
1930 - 1931; 1931	William M. Goeshy (Keeper); Beatrice E. Goeshy, his wife (laborer)	$1,320 - $1,440 $180
December 1, 1931 - March 29, 1938; 1937	John J. Daley (keeper); Nelson S. Atherton (additional keeper*)	$1,440 unknown
March 29, 1938 - July 31, 1938	Gatha F. Cattee	$1,440
August 1, 1938 - June 30, 1942	Walther J. Westcott	$1,740
July 1, 1942 - February 29, 1960	John W. Hansen	unknown

- helping with station duties when the primary keeper was injured.
