= Calvert Marine Museum =

Maritime museum in Maryland, US

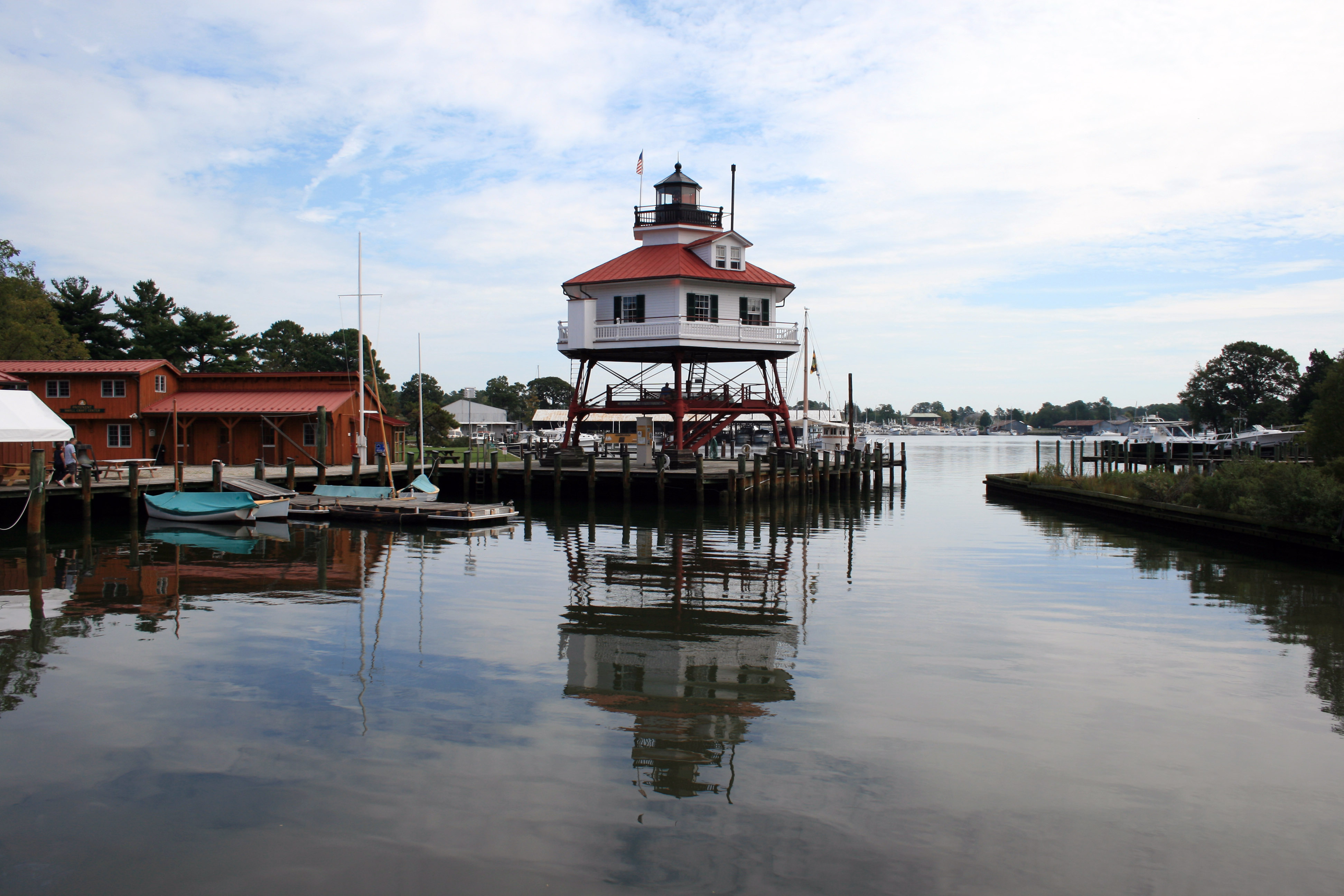
- Drum Point Light in October 2012
- Established: 18 October 1970
- Location: 14200 Solomons Island Road, Solomons, MD 20688, USA
- Coordinates: 38°19′52″N 76°27′48″W
- Type: Regional science and history museum
- Accreditation: American Alliance of Museums
- Key holdings: Fossils of Calvert Cliffs, Megalodon skeleton, Drum Point Light, Wm. B. Tennison historic boat, J. C. Lore Oyster House, aquarium and the North American river otter habitat
- Collections: regional paleontology, estuarine life of the Patuxent River and Chesapeake Bay, maritime history
- Collection size: 200,000
- Visitors: 87589 (2018)
- Founders: Daniel Barrett Jr., William Dovel, Alton Kersey, Joseph C. Lore Jr., LeRoy Langley
- Director: Jeffrey Murray
- Curators: Carey Crane (exhibits), Mark Wilkins (maritime history), Stephen Godfrey (paleontology), Matt Neff (estuarine biology)
- Owner: Calvert County Government
- Parking: On site (no charge)
- Website: www.calvertmarinemuseum.com

The Calvert Marine Museum is a museum located in Solomons, Maryland.

The museum has three main themes:

- paleontology of Maryland,
- estuarine life of the Patuxent River and Chesapeake Bay,
- maritime history.

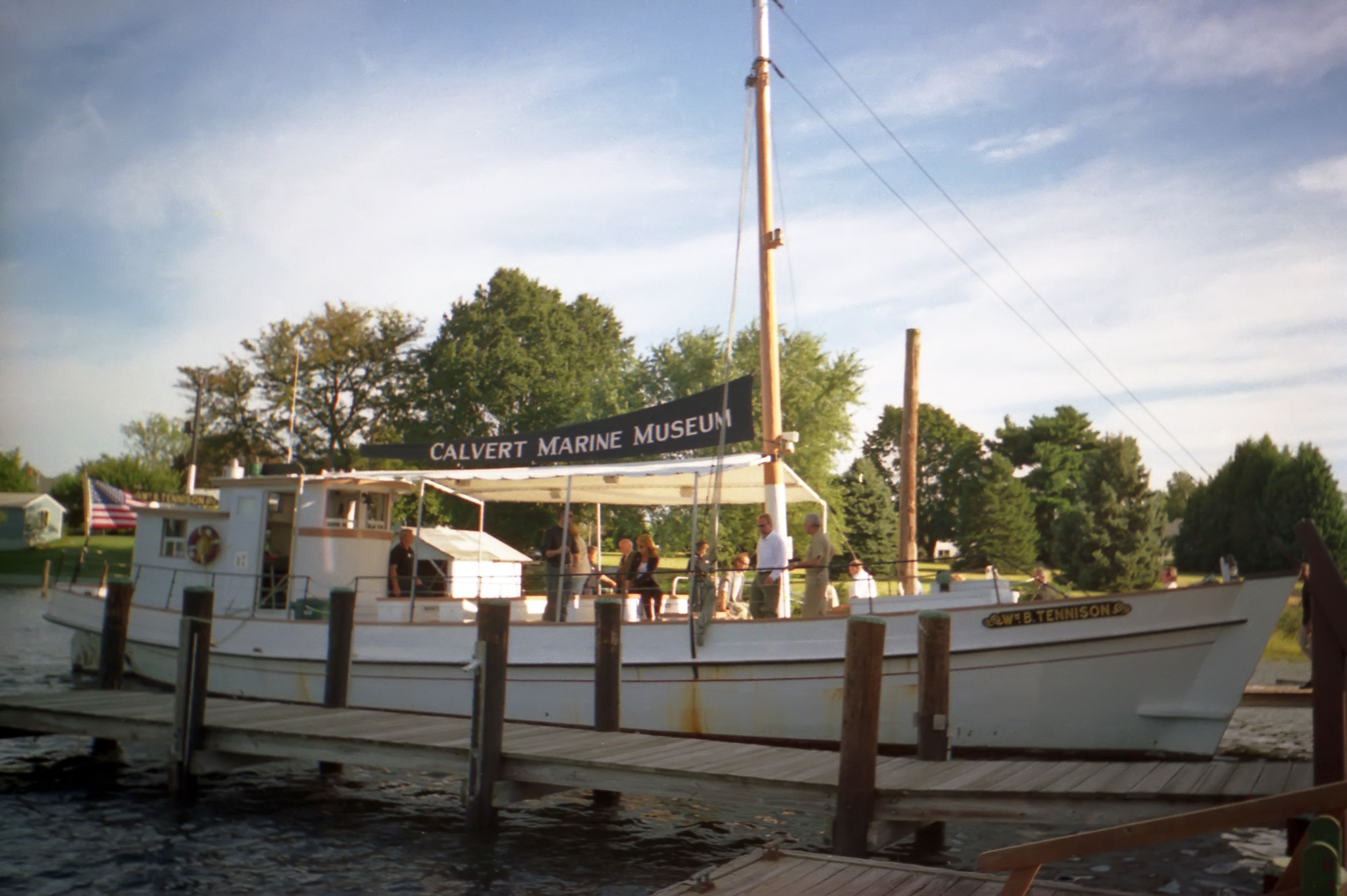
William B. Tennison historic boat before overhaul (2003)

Among its exhibits are the Drum Point Light, the bugeye Wm. B. Tennison, and the J. C. Lore Oyster House; the latter two are National Historic Landmarks. It also houses artifacts from the old Cedar Point Light, and maintains the Drum Point Light and grounds.

The museum also features several aquatic exhibits including an outdoor habitat for their North American river otters, and indoor aquarium exhibits for the sting ray, skates, the non-native lionfish, and numerous other species native to the Chesapeake Bay and its tributaries.

Calvert Marine Museum Mission Statement:

The Calvert Marine Museum inspires learning, discovery, and stewardship of the Chesapeake Bay and Southern Maryland’s paleontology, estuarine life, and maritime history.

Calvert Marine Museum Vision Statement:

The Calvert Marine Museum envisions a vibrant future with engaging exhibits, comprehensive research, and innovative education. We aspire to be the leading destination for exploring the prehistoric past, thriving estuarine ecosystems, and enduring maritime traditions of the Chesapeake Bay region.

== See also ==
- Megalodon
- List of maritime museums in the United States
- List of museum ships
