= Crain Highway =

Robert Crain Highway is a multilane divided highway in the U.S. state of Maryland running from Newburg at the Governor Harry W. Nice Memorial Bridge north to Governor Ritchie Highway in Glen Burnie, named after Robert Crain, a lawyer and Democratic legislator in the state who fought for its construction and oversaw its completion in 1927. It follows:

- U.S. Route 301 from Newburg to Bowie
- Maryland Route 5 from Waldorf to Brandywine
- Maryland Route 3 from Bowie to Millersville
- Maryland Route 450 from Bowie to Crofton
- Maryland Route 3 Business in Glen Burnie
