= Anthony Smith (wide receiver) =

American football player (born 2002)

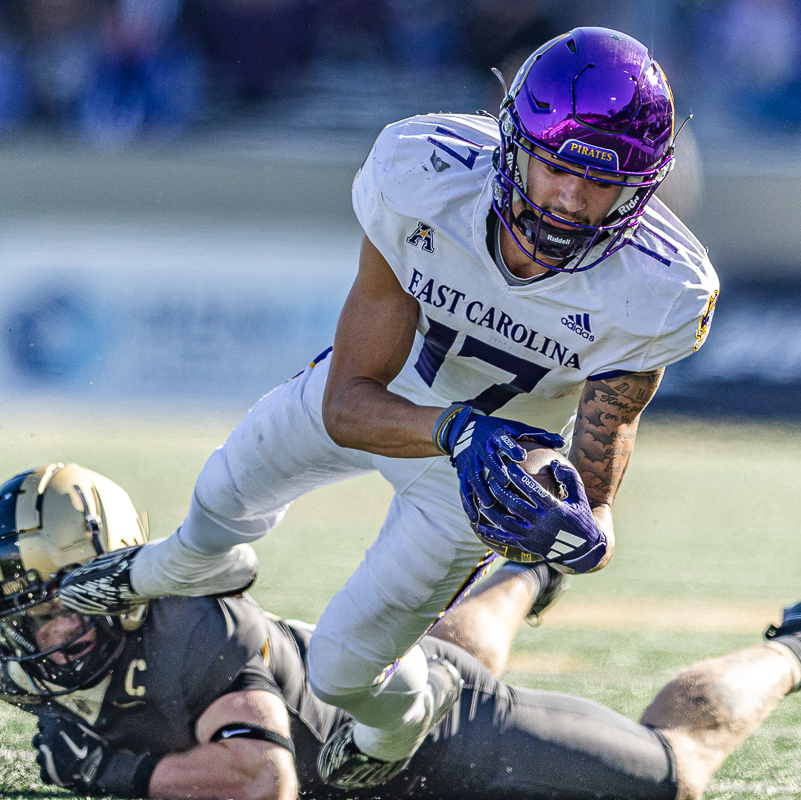
- Smith with East Carolina in 2024

No. 83 – Dallas Cowboys
- Position: Wide receiver
- Roster status: Practice squad

Personal information
- Born: March 1, 2002 (age 24)
- Listed height: 6 ft 2 in (1.88 m)
- Listed weight: 197 lb (89 kg)

Career information
- High school: Huntingtown (Huntingtown, Maryland)
- College: NC State (2020–2023); East Carolina (2024–2025)
- NFL draft: 2026: 7th round, 218th overall pick

Career history
- Dallas Cowboys (2026–present)*
- * Offseason or practice squad member only

Awards and highlights
- First-team All-American Conference (2025)
- Stats at Pro Football Reference

Anthony Smith (born March 1, 2002) is an American professional football wide receiver for the Dallas Cowboys of the National Football League (NFL). He played college football for the NC State Wolfpack and East Carolina Pirates and was selected by the Cowboys in the seventh round of the 2026 NFL draft.

== Early life ==
Smith was born on March 1, 2002, and grew up in Virginia. He played football for the first time at age seven. Smith attended Huntingtown High School where he competed in football and track and field. He did not play football his first two years at high school due to his small size, then served as the team's punter as a junior before starting at wide receiver as a senior. Smith recorded 918 receiving yards and 14 touchdowns in his senior year, being selected all-country and all-state. In track and field, he won the state championships in the 55 metres, with a time of 6.36 seconds, and the 300 metres, with a time of 34.49 seconds. A three-star recruit, Smith committed to play college football for the NC State Wolfpack.

== College career ==
Smith was considered the fastest player on NC State while he played there. He began his career on the scout team. As a true freshman in 2020, he caught five passes for 69 yards and a touchdown. He then caught four passes for 97 yards and a touchdown in 2021, two passes for 58 yards and a touchdown in 2022, and only two passes for 19 yards in 2023. Smith transferred to the East Carolina Pirates in 2024. He started every game in two years with the Pirates. In 2024, he caught 41 passes for 799 yards and six touchdowns. Smith then totaled 64 catches for 1,053 yards and seven touchdowns in his final year in 2025, being selected first-team All-American Conference. In the 2025 Military Bowl, he was named MVP after recording 156 receiving yards and two touchdowns. Across his six years of college football, Smith caught 118 passes for 2,095 yards and 16 touchdowns.

== Professional career ==
Pre-draft measurables
Height	Weight	Arm length	Hand span	Wingspan	40-yard dash	10-yard split	20-yard split	20-yard shuttle	Three-cone drill	Vertical jump	Broad jump	Bench press
6 ft 2 1/4 in (1.89 m)	197 lb (89 kg)	31 7/8 in (0.81 m)	8 7/8 in (0.23 m)	6 ft 5 in (1.96 m)	4.45 s	1.49 s	2.58 s	4.28 s	6.94 s	36.0 in (0.91 m)	10 ft 3 in (3.12 m)	12 reps
All values from Pro Day

Smith was selected by the Dallas Cowboys in the seventh round (218th overall) of the 2026 NFL draft. On August 30, he was waived by the Cowboys as a part of final roster cuts; he was re–signed to the team's practice squad the next day.
