= Huntingtown High School =

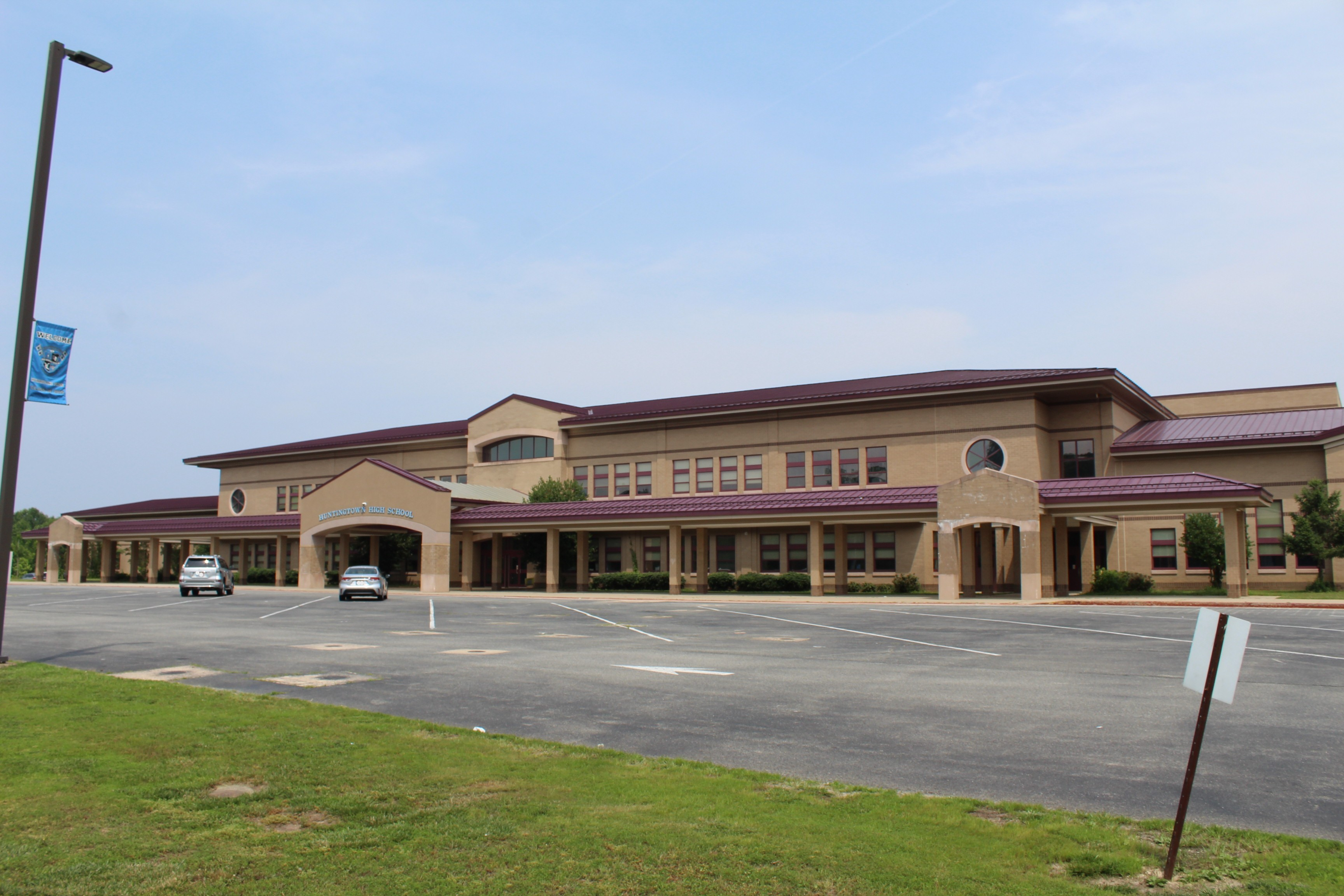
- Front of building that faces Maryland Route 4

Location
- 4125 North Solomons Island Road; Huntingtown, Calvert, Maryland 20639; United States; 38°37′10″N 76°36′35″W

Information
- Type: Public Secondary
- Opened: 2004
- School district: Calvert County Public Schools
- Principal: Beth Morton
- Enrollment: 1,438 (2015-16)
- Hours in school day: 7
- Colors: Black, Carolina Blue, Grey, White
- Athletics conference: Southern Maryland Athletic Conference
- Mascot: Hurricanes
- Rival: Northern High School (Owings, Maryland)
- Newspaper: The Forecast
- Website: http://hhsweb.calvertnet.k12.md.us/

Huntingtown High School is located at 4125 North Solomons Island Road, Huntingtown, Maryland (MD), United States. Completed and opened in 2004, HHS is currently home to approximately fifteen hundred students from grades 9 to 12. Huntingtown High School (HHS) is in Calvert County, and is part of the Calvert County Public Schools (CCPS).

== Campus ==
The HHS campus features, aside from its building and traffic pattern: a football field, softball and baseball fields, a track, eight tennis courts and an assortment of practice fields and storm-water management ponds. The large, 3-story building is widely considered to be hideous and grotesque by all who come across it, and is surrounded by these and two parking lots exiting onto Maryland Route 4. There is also a nature trail/cross country path which runs through the woods surrounding the building.

== Academics ==
Huntingtown offers 21 Advanced Placement courses, as well as honors and standard classes.

== Athletics ==
HHS hosts a variety of sports teams. The Hurricanes compete in the Southern Maryland Athletic Conference (SMAC). They also compete in the 3A South Region of the Maryland Public Secondary Schools Athletic Association. Fall sports include football, boys' and girls' soccer, field hockey, cross country, golf, and volleyball. Winter sports include swimming, boys' and girls' basketball, indoor track, wrestling, and ice hockey. There are also cheer and dance teams for both the fall and winter. Spring sports include boys' and girls' lacrosse, softball, baseball, track and field, and tennis, and cheer.

=== Baseball ===
The Huntingtown baseball has won their first state title on May 30, 2016 defeating Chesapeake High School of Pasadena 4–3. This was also the first state champion won by a boys' team as well as the first baseball champion won by a high school in Calvert County.

== Programs in the arts ==
=== Music ===
Huntingtown's Music Department has students attend the Maryland All-State music programs, as well as various other honors ensembles.

=== Marching Band ===
The HHS Marching Hurricanes, composed of about 65 instrumentalists and guard members at the time.

== Additional programs ==
=== Robotics ===
The HHS Robotics team was established in 2009, and has competed yearly in local VEX Robotics Competitions. They have competed in the State Vex Competition twice.

== Notable alumni ==
- Trevon Jenifer, member of the USA National Wheelchair Basketball Team
- Jeffrie Long Jr., politician
- Anthony Smith, NFL wide receiver for the Dallas Cowboys

== See also ==
List of high schools in Maryland
