= James E. Chaney =

United States Army general

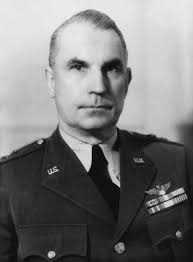
- Chaney in 1942
- Born: March 16, 1885; Chaneyville, Maryland
- Died: August 21, 1967 (aged 82); Washington, D.C.
- Military career
- Allegiance: United States
- Branch: United States Army
- Service years: 1908–1947
- Rank: Major General
- Commands: Western Pacific Base Command; Western Technical Training Command; Army Air Forces Basic Training Center; First Air Force; Special Army Observers Group; Northeast Air District; Randolph Field Air Corps Training Center; Air Corps Advanced Flying School; Air Corps Primary Flying School; School of Military Aeronautics
- Conflicts: World War I World War II
- Awards: Army Distinguished Service Medal; Legion of Merit (3)

James Eugene Chaney (March 16, 1885 – August 21, 1967) was a senior United States Army officer. He served in both World War I and World War II.

== Early life ==
Chaney was born in Chaneyville, Maryland. He studied at public schools in Dunkirk, Maryland, and for three years at Baltimore City College. He was then appointed to United States Military Academy by Senator Louis E. McComas. Chaney entered the academy with his class on June 16, 1904. Alongside his studies Chaney engaged in extra-curricular activities. Chaney was a hop manager, played polo and worked up to the status of Cadet Captain. He graduated from the academy on February 14, 1908, and was appointed as a second lieutenant in the infantry.

== Military career ==
Upon graduation, Chaney was assigned back to West Point to supervise the training of the new Fourth Class which entered the academy on March 2, 1908. In February 1910, Chaney served with his first regiment, the 9th infantry based at Fort Sam Houston in Texas. He was subsequently detached for service in Europe, Africa and Asia up to July 1910.

Chaney rejoined his regiment at Iloilo in the Philippines, serving there until June 1912. He then returned to West Point as an instructor in modern languages up to July 1914. In September 1914 he was based at the Presidio of San Francisco with the 30th Infantry before being ordered to Hawaii in December. Serving with the 25th Infantry at Schofield Barracks until September 1917, he was then detailed to the Air Service and returned to the United States.

Chaney was first stationed until November 1917 at Chanute Field, Illinois. He was then appointed commandant of the School of Military Aeronautics in Columbus, Ohio up until June 1918. He next moved on to be executive officer of the Operations Section at the Office of the Director of Military Aeronautics in Washington D.C. up until August 1918.

=== World War I ===
In August 1918 Chaney served in Europe at Air Service Headquarters Service of Supplies for a month before joining the Headquarters of the Chief of Air Service, American Expeditionary Forces (AEF). There he served for a further month on the coordination staff. For the remainder of the year Chaney worked in the Office of the Chief of Air Service while also executive officer at the Office of the Assistant Chief of Staff. He held these posts until February 1919.

=== Interwar years ===
As part of the allied occupation of the Rhineland, Chaney commanded the Coblenz aerodrome in Germany up to April 1919. From there he served in the Office of the Air Service Commander of the Third Army until June. Leaving the occupation force he took command of Air Service Production Centre at Romorantin in France to August. Then until October he was United States aviation officer for the Provisional District of Great Britain.

From Britain Chaney went on to serve as an assistant military air attaché in Rome, Italy. He served in this capacity from October 1919 until June 1924. After Rome Chaney returned to the United States with service at Langley Field, Virginia until October 1924.

Attending the Command and General Staff School at Fort Leavenworth in Kansas, Chaney graduated with honours in June 1926. His service continued as commandant (up to March 1928) of the Air Corps Primary Flying School at Brooks Field and the Air Corps Advanced Flying School, Kelly Field in Texas to June 1930.

Chaney returned to Washington D.C. to attend the Army War College up to June 1931. Following graduation he was assigned to duty in the Office of the Chief of Air Corps in the city until January the following year. He attended the Disarmament Conference in Geneva, Switzerland. There he acted, until June 1932, as a technical advisor to General George S. Simonds. Following this he resumed his duties in Washington D.C. until April 1935. It was in this period in Washington that Chaney was appointed assistant chief of the Air Corps.

Chaney led the Randolph Field Air Corps Training Center in Texas. He held this post from May 1935 until he completed his tour as assistant chief of Air Corps in July 1938. From Texas Chaney was posted as head of the Air Defence Command at Mitchel Field, New York in January 1940. Chaney was given further responsibility as commanding general of the Northeast Air District in October.

=== World War II ===
Chaney was promoted to major general in 1940. From October to November 1940 he returned to Europe as an observer of the Battle of Britain and Blitz on London. May 1941 saw Chaney formally assigned to the United Kingdom. Based in London, he acted as Special Army Observer and Head of the Special Army Observers Group. Chaney headed the Army Observers Group from May 1941 to June 20, 1942. In addition to this role Chaney was theatre commander in Europe from January 8 to June 20, 1942. Towards the end of this period, the European Theater of Operations, United States Army was established on June 8, 1942. Chaney was subsequently replaced as theatre commander by Major General Dwight D. Eisenhower.

Returning to Mitchel Field in July 1942 Chaney was appointed commanding general of the First Air Force. He led the Army Air Forces Basic Training Center at Sheppard Field, Texas from May 1942 to November 1944. He then moved to Western Technical Training Command in Denver, Colorado.

Turning his attention to the war in the Pacific, Chaney was given command of Army forces for the Battle of Iwo Jima from November 1944 until July 1945. As commander at Iwo Jima from March 1945, he commanded all United States Forces on the island. Assigned command as general of the Western Pacific Base Command in August 1945 Chaney had his headquarters on Saipan. Then in October 1945, he was made a member (later president) of the Secretary of War's Personnel Board in Washington, D.C. There he served until he retired on July 31, 1947, at his own request.

== Personal life ==
Chaney married Miriam Clark on February 10, 1910. She was the daughter of Colonel Charles Hobart Clark, and the granddaughter of General René Edward De Russy, a former Superintendent of the United States Military Academy at West Point New York. Chaney died on August 21, 1967, and was buried at Arlington National Cemetery in Arlington, Virginia. Miriam survived her husband by six weeks, dying after a long illness in 1967.
