= Calvert High School (Prince Frederick, Maryland) =

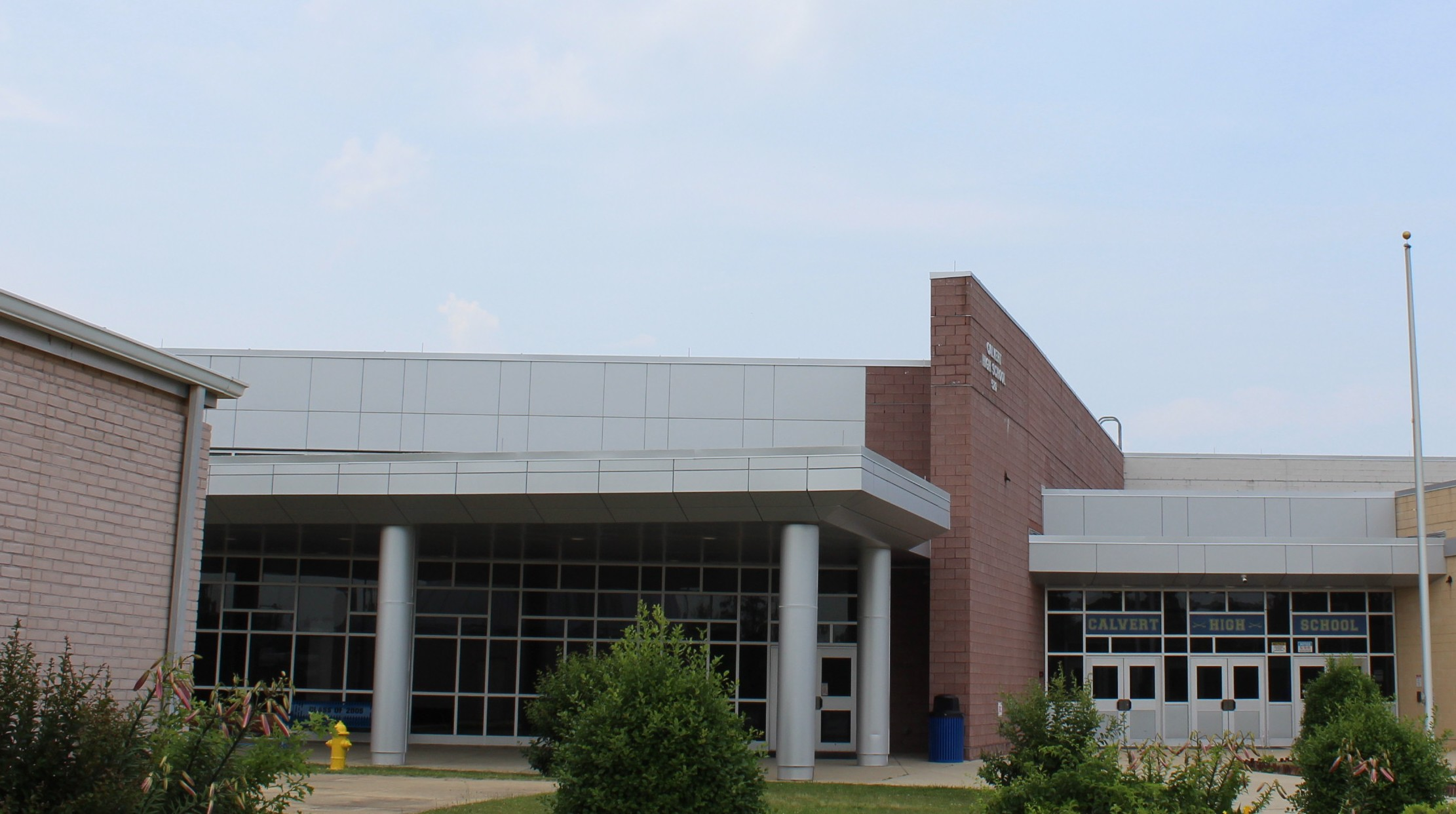
- Front entrance

Location
- 520 Fox Run Blvd; Prince Frederick, Maryland; United States; 38°33′11″N 76°34′57″W

Information
- Type: Public Secondary
- Motto: "Involvement Equals Success"
- Established: 1963 (present name)
- School district: Calvert County Public Schools
- Principal: Darrel Prioleau
- Grades: 9–12
- Enrollment: 1,173 (2015-16)
- Campus type: Suburban
- Colors: Blue and gold
- Athletics conference: Southern Maryland Athletic Conference
- Mascot: Cavaliers
- Rival: Patuxent High School
- Newspaper: The Courier
- Website: chsweb.calvertnet.k12.md.us

Calvert High School is a public high school in Prince Frederick, Maryland, United States and is part of the Calvert County Public Schools.

== Education ==
Along with many achievements in sports Calvert high school has had significant success in academic achievements. Such related activities include the success of the Vex robotics team. In 2014 one of its teams, 1670d, attended the world competition in Anaheim, California.

As of 2015, the total attendees of Calvert is 1,166 students total that make up grades nine through twelve. The attendance rate among these students is 93.8%. Out of these 1,166 student in 2015, 591 are female and 575 are male. 7% of students are receiving special services for Special Education.

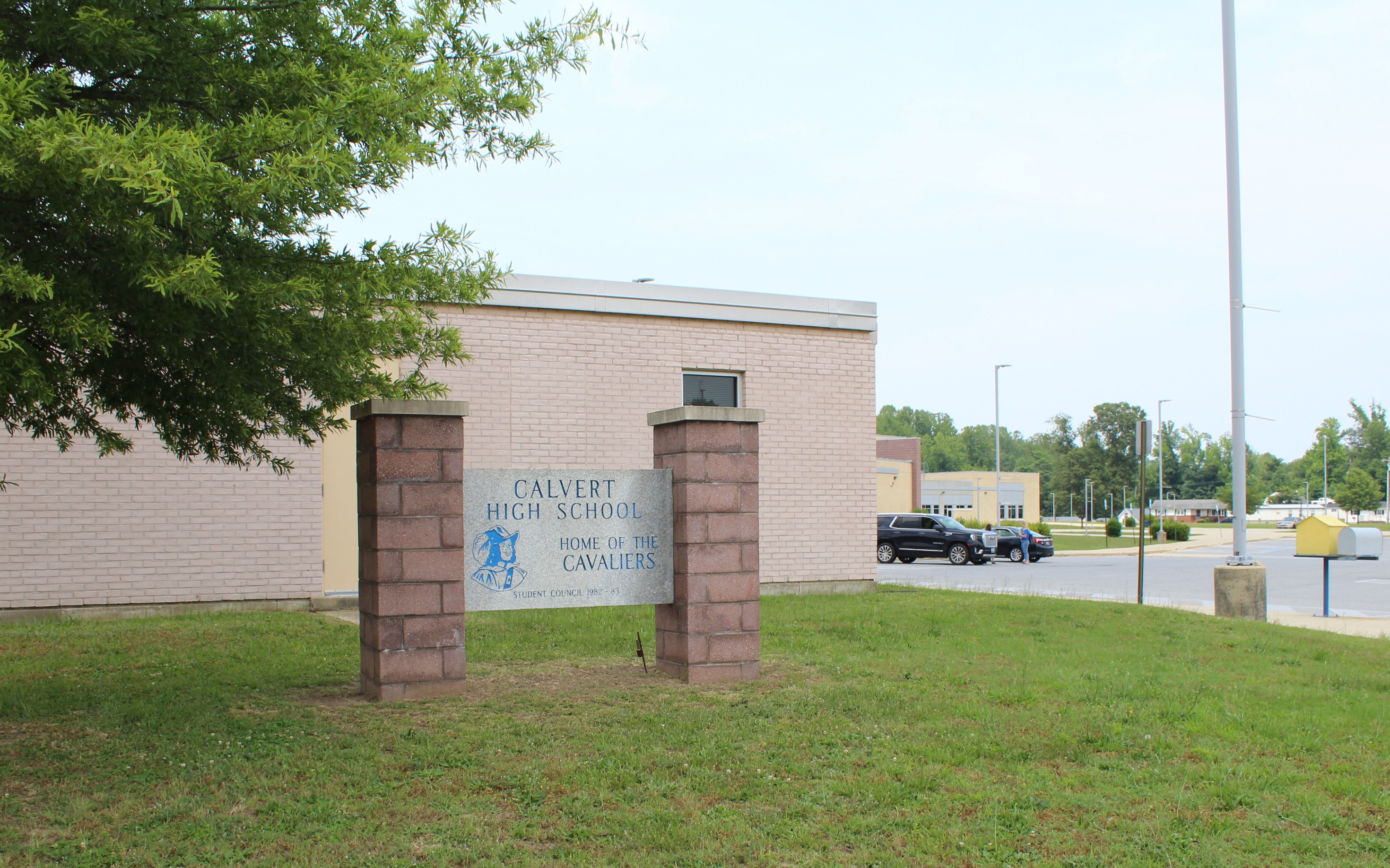
"Home of the Cavaliers" sign in front of the Arthur Storer Planetarium

Calvert High's school mascot is the Cavalier. The sports teams compete in the Southern Maryland Athletic Conference. Calvert High's athletic rivals include the neighboring schools of Northern High School, Huntingtown High School, and Patuxent High School. In 1998, Calvert's volleyball team, under the direction of Head Coach Timothy Horsemon, won the 3A State Championship. In 2003, the Lady Cavaliers, led by head coach David Redden, won the 2A State Championship, losing only two sets the entire season. In 2000, the Cavaliers captured the Maryland State Division 3A American football championship under the leadership of head coach Jerry Franks. In 2015, the Calvert High School Varsity Girls Soccer Team also added to Calvert's achievements by winning the Maryland 2A State Championship under the leadership of Dawn Lister and Damon Williams. Calvert High and Patuxent High are the only 2A schools in the county.

== History ==
Before moving to its current campus in 1963, Calvert High School used to be along Maryland Route 2/Maryland Route 4. The building once served as a building for Calvert Middle School, a public middle school that serves as a feeder school of Calvert High. Calvert Middle School recently moved from that building and built a new school in Prince Frederick. In 1965, desegregation of the Calvert County Public Schools led to Brooks High School — the county's then all-black high school — being merged with Calvert High.

The campus is on Dares Beach Road and includes the main school building, a gym for basketball games, a football stadium, a baseball field, tennis courts, a soccer field, a lacrosse and field hockey field, and a large auditorium used for school concerts and plays. Additionally, it also includes the Arthur Storer Planetarium, named for the Calvert County resident and the original namesake of Halley's Comet. A vocational education center is adjacent to the main school building.

== Notable alumni ==
- Earl F. Hance (born 1955), Secretary of the Maryland Department of Agriculture
- Thomas E. Hutchins, Maryland State Delegate, Secretary of the Maryland Department of Veterans Affairs, Secretary of Maryland State Police
- F. Reynolds Mackie (died 1972), member of the Maryland House of Delegates
- George W. Owings III (1945–2023), Maryland State Delegate and Secretary of the Maryland Department of Veterans Affairs
