= William B. Gibbs Jr. =

American educator and activist (1905–1984)

- Born: July 26, 1905; West Chester, Pennsylvania, US
- Died: December 27, 1984 (aged 79); Bryn Mawr, Pennsylvania, US
- Education: Cheyney University
- Occupations: Educator, civil rights activist
- Known for: Plaintiff in Gibbs v. Broome (1936) civil rights case

William B. Gibbs Jr. (July 26, 1905 – December 27, 1984) was an American educator, civil rights activist, and the plaintiff in Gibbs v. Broome (1936), an influential racial discrimination case argued by future United States Supreme Court justice Thurgood Marshall on behalf of Gibbs and the NAACP.

== Early life and education ==
Gibbs was born on July 26, 1905, in West Chester, Pennsylvania, to Lena W. and William Gibbs Sr. He grew up in West Chester, graduated from West Chester High School, and received a two-year degree in elementary education from Cheyney University in 1925. He found work as a schoolteacher in Maryland and in 1930 became acting principal at the Rosenwald Colored Elementary School in Rockville, Maryland.

== Gibbs v. Broome ==
In 1936, Gibbs wrote to the NAACP volunteering to become the NAACP's plaintiff in a pay equity discrimination case against the Montgomery County School Board and school superintendent Edwin Broome. Known as Gibbs v. Broome, the case featured Thurgood Marshall as lead counsel for Gibbs. Montgomery County school policy at the time limited Black teachers to receiving approximately half the compensation received by white teachers. The NAACP argued that this pay inequity infringed Gibbs’ 14th Amendment rights and the separate but equal doctrine laid down in the 1896 U.S. Supreme Court decision in Plessy v. Ferguson. After trying and failing to dismiss the case, the Montgomery County School Board settled out of court on December 8, 1936, agreeing to raise Black teachers' salaries to match the salaries of white teachers within two years. Along with a separate case filed the following year against Maryland's Calvert County School District by Harriet Elizabeth Brown, it paved the way for the Maryland Teachers Pay Equalization Law in 1939, which equalized teacher pay statewide. Gibbs v. Broome was also one of the cases that laid the legal foundations for Marshall to win the case of Brown v. Board of Education (1956), in which the United States Supreme Court declared racially segregated schools unconstitutional nationwide.

The William B. Gibbs Jr. Elementary School in Germantown, Maryland, is named in honor of Gibbs.

== Later life and death ==
The Montgomery County School Board fired Gibbs a year after the settlement. He received financial aid from Maryland's black teachers' association. He worked in youth programming in Pennsylvania before becoming principal of Auburn Elementary School in Swedesboro, New Jersey, in 1940. He taught junior high until his retirement in 1971. He served as a pastor in the African Methodist Episcopal Zion Church from 1944 until his death.

Gibbs died in Bryn Mawr, Pennsylvania, on December 27, 1984, at the age of 79. He was buried in West Chester, Pennsylvania.
