= Calvert County Public Schools =

Public school district in Maryland, US

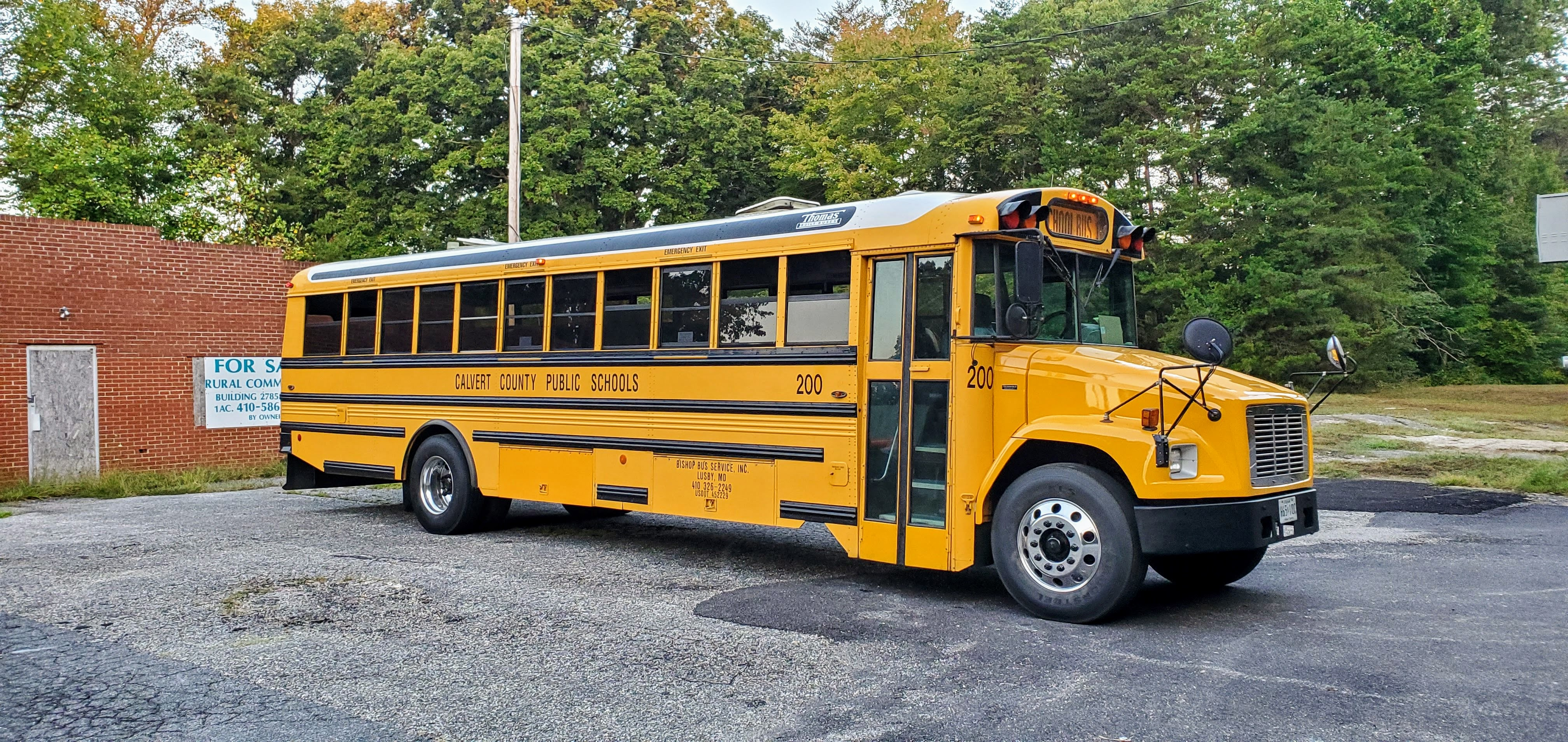
- District school bus

Location
- 1305 Dares Beach Road; Prince Frederick, Maryland 20678 Calvert County, Maryland United States

District information
- Type: Public
- Grades: Pre-K through 12
- Superintendent: Dr. Marcus J. Newsome
- School board: • Antoine S. White, Pres. • Inez N. Claggett, VP • Dawn C. Balinski • Lisa M. Grenis • Jana L. Smith-Post
- Schools: 25

Students and staff
- Students: 15,179 (2024–25)
- Teachers: 1,052 (2024–25)

Other information
- Website: Official website

Calvert County Public Schools is a public school district serving all of Calvert County, Maryland. The district is governed by a six-person Board of Education, five of which are elected by the public in non-partisan elections, and a student elected by the Calvert Association of Student Councils. The school district currently has 4 high schools, 6 middle schools, and 13 elementary schools.

== High schools ==
- Calvert, Prince Frederick, Maryland
- Huntingtown, Huntingtown, Maryland
- Northern, Chaneyville, Maryland
- Patuxent, Lusby, Maryland

== Middle schools ==
- Calvert, Prince Frederick, Maryland
- Mill Creek, Lusby, Maryland
- Northern, Chaneyville, Maryland
- Plum Point, Huntingtown, Maryland
- Southern, Lusby, Maryland
- Windy Hill, Owings, Maryland

== Elementary schools ==
- Appeal, Lusby, Maryland
- Beach, Chesapeake Beach, Maryland
- Barstow, Barstow, Maryland
- Calvert, Prince Frederick, Maryland
- Dowell, near Solomons, Maryland
- Huntingtown, Huntingtown, Maryland
- Mt. Harmony, Owings, Maryland
- Mutual, Port Republic, Maryland
- Patuxent, Lusby, Maryland
- Plum Point, Huntingtown, Maryland
- St. Leonard, St. Leonard, Maryland
- Sunderland, Sunderland, Maryland
- Windy Hill, Owings, Maryland

== Other institutions ==
Other institutions under the Calvert County Public School district include Calvert Country School, a special education school, and the Career & Technology Academy (formally known as the Calvert Career Center), a vocational education center.

== Future schools ==
The district's twelfth elementary school, Barstow Elementary School in Barstow opened in late 2008. Northern High School in Owings finished reconstruction in early 2020.

== See also ==
- Harriet Elizabeth Brown
- List of school districts in Maryland
