= Harriet Elizabeth Brown =

American educator (1907–2009)

Harriet Elizabeth Brown (sometimes called "Libby") (February 10, 1907 — January 1, 2009) was a Calvert County schoolteacher who pushed for equal pay, regardless of race, in Maryland education. With the help of NAACP attorney Thurgood Marshall, Brown sued the Calvert County Board of Education in 1937. At the time, African-American teachers were paid significantly less than their Euro-American colleagues. Brown was paid almost 50% less than her Euro-American counterparts with similar credentials. Calvert County settled on December 27, 1937, and agreed to equalize pay.

Brown's suit followed a 1936 lawsuit brought by Marshall and the NAACP on behalf of Montgomery County Public Schools principal William B. Gibbs Jr. Montgomery County's school board settled that case as well, and agreed to equalize teacher pay regardless of race. In 1939, the Maryland Teachers Pay Equalization Law was passed, the first Maryland state equalization law. Brown was inducted into the Maryland Women's Hall of Fame in 1994.

== Teaching ==
Brown began working in Calvert County Public Schools in 1931. She worked there for more than 30 years.

== Death ==
Harriet Elizabeth Brown died on January 1, 2009, at the age of 101. She is buried at Southern Memorial Gardens in Dunkirk, Maryland.
