= Jaelyn Duncan =

American football player (born 2000)

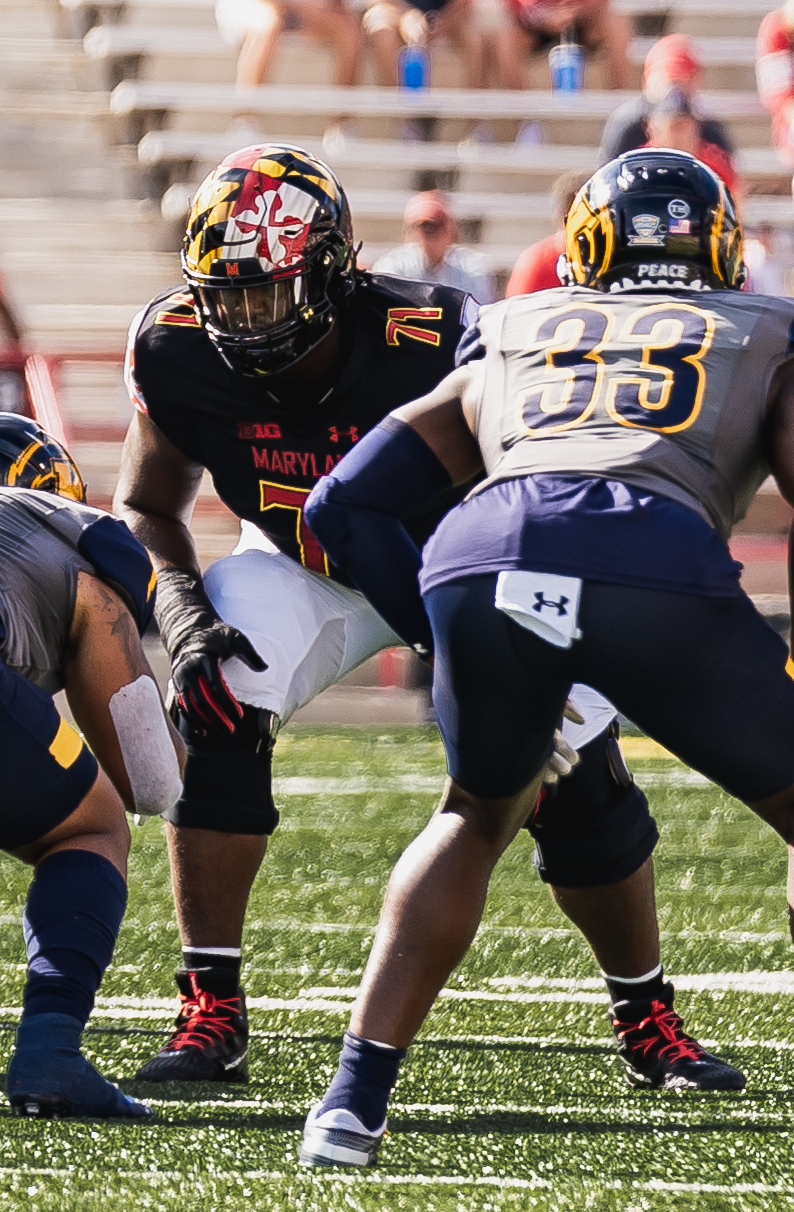
- Duncan (71) with the Maryland Terrapins in 2021

No. 71 – DC Defenders
- Position: Offensive tackle
- Roster status: Active

Personal information
- Born: July 8, 2000 (age 26); Silver Spring, Maryland, U.S.
- Listed height: 6 ft 6 in (1.98 m)
- Listed weight: 322 lb (146 kg)

Career information
- High school: Saint Frances Academy (Baltimore, Maryland)
- College: Maryland (2018–2022)
- NFL draft: 2023: 6th round, 186th overall pick

Career history
- Tennessee Titans (2023–2024); DC Defenders (2026–present)

Career NFL statistics as of 2024
- Games played: 15
- Games started: 8
- Stats at Pro Football Reference

Jaelyn Alexander Duncan (born July 8, 2000) is an American professional football offensive tackle for the DC Defenders of the United Football League (UFL). He played college football for the Maryland Terrapins and was selected by the Titans in the sixth round of the 2023 NFL draft.

== Early life ==
Duncan attended Northern High School in Owings, Maryland for three years, before transferring to Saint Frances Academy in Baltimore, Maryland for his senior year. He was selected to play in the Under Armour All-American Game in 2018. He committed to the University of Maryland, College Park to play college football.

== College career ==
After not playing his first year at Maryland in 2018, Duncan took over as the starting left tackle his redshirt freshman year in 2019. As a sophomore in 2020, he started all five of Maryland's games. As a junior in 2021, he played in all 13 games with 13 starts including Maryland's bowl victory over Virginia Tech in the Pinstripe Bowl. Duncan returned to Maryland for his senior season in 2022.

In January 2023, Duncan was invited to participate in both the 2023 Senior Bowl and the 2023 NFL Combine.

== Professional career ==
Pre-draft measurables
Height	Weight	Arm length	Hand span	Wingspan	40-yard dash	10-yard split	20-yard split	Three-cone drill	Vertical jump	Broad jump	Bench press
6 ft 5 5/8 in (1.97 m)	306 lb (139 kg)	33 5/8 in (0.85 m)	9 1/4 in (0.23 m)	6 ft 7 1/8 in (2.01 m)	5.10 s	1.78 s	2.94 s	7.95 s	31.5 in (0.80 m)	9 ft 5 in (2.87 m)	25 reps
All values from NFL Combine/Pro Day

=== Tennessee Titans ===
Duncan was drafted by the Tennessee Titans in the sixth round, 186th overall, of the 2023 NFL draft. As a rookie, Duncan appeared in ten games and started five in the 2023 season.

Duncan appeared in four games at the beginning of the 2024 season, but he suffered a hamstring injury in Week 7 during his start against the Buffalo Bills. He was placed on injured reserve on October 26. He was activated on December 23, playing one more game in Week 17 against the Jacksonville Jaguars. He had three starts during the season.

On August 26, 2025, Duncan was waived by the Titans as part of final roster cuts

=== DC Defenders ===
On January 14, 2026, Duncan was selected by the DC Defenders of the United Football League (UFL).
