= Chopticon High School =

High school in Maryland, US

Coordinates: 38.35973°N 76.70589°W

Location
- 25390 Colton Point Rd; Morganza, Maryland 20660-9999; United States

Information
- Type: Public Secondary
- Motto: Pride Inside
- Established: 1965
- School district: St. Mary's County Public Schools
- NCES School ID: 240060001218
- Principal: Jennifer Consalvo
- Faculty: 75 (2018–2019)
- Grades: 9–12
- Enrollment: 1,679 (2018–2019)
- Campus: Rural
- Colors: Red and Black
- Athletics: Southern Maryland Athletic Conference
- Emblem: Braves
- Website: Chopticon High

Chopticon High School is a public high school located in Morganza, Maryland, United States. The school serves students in grades 9–12. It offers college preparatory programs and programs that prepare students for business and technical occupations. It serves the community in the northern portion of St. Mary's County, Maryland, between the Potomac River and Patuxent River. The area is mainly rural communities, with a recent rise in suburban development. Many of the families are employed by NAS Patuxent River, government contractors, St. Mary's College of Maryland, St Mary's County government, and traditional agriculture and water-related businesses.

Chopticon High School is accredited by the Middle States Association of Colleges and Secondary Schools and the Maryland State Department of Education. Chopticon also offers the Academy of Visual and Performing Arts (AVPA) and the Academy of Finance (AOF). Chopticon High School belongs to the St. Mary's County Public School System (or SMCPS) and is associated with two other county high schools: Great Mills High School and Leonardtown High School.

Chopticon High School was founded in 1965, as a replacement to Margaret Brent High School (founded in 1921 – now Margaret Brent Middle School).

== History ==
Chopticon High School opened in 1965, named after the local Chopticon tribe of American Indians. The school blended students from Margaret Brent High School and Benjamin Banneker High School, which had been segregated by race.

On August 3, 1984, custodian Lester B. Broome murdered teacher Beverly Jo Heater. Broome was hired despite being described as having “a known history of criminal battery, sexual violence, dangerous misconduct and theft.” In 1985, Broome pleaded guilty of murder in exchange for the prosecution to not seek the death penalty at a Prince George's County court.

In the early 2000s, the school established a committee to determine whether the school's mascot, the Braves, should be replaced. The committee determined that no action was necessary.

The high school made news in 2015 when, on May 20, several students broke in at 3:40 am and released 72,000 ladybugs throughout the school. The four students, who were seniors at the school, were charged with 4th degree burglary, property destruction under $1,000 and disruption of school activities.

== Academics ==
Advanced Placement (AP) courses are offered at Chopticon, with an AP participation rate of 21% as of 2024. Extracurriculars are also available at Chopticon, including Future Farmers of America, band, and theatre, among others.

The represented JROTC branch at Chopticon is the U.S. Air Force.

== Demographics ==
As of 2024, the racial makeup of the school is:

- 79% White
- 8.3% African American
- 6.5% Two or more races
- 5.1% Hispanic
- 0.7% Asian
- 0.2% American Indian/Alaska Native
- 0.1% Native Hawaiian/Pacific Islander

32% of students are economically disadvantaged, with 32% of students on free or reduced lunch.

== Music ==
The Chopticon marching band, also known as "The Showband of Southern Maryland," won 7 consecutive USBands Maryland State Championships from 2009 to 2015, their 8th in 2018, and their 9th in 2024. In 2025, the band was group 1A co-state champions alongside Northern High School after both tied with a score of 88.300 at the USBands Maryland & Virginia State Championship at Calvert Hall College High School. Under the direction of former director Todd Burroughs, the Chopticon marching band also won the USBands 2A National Championships in 2012.

== Sports ==
Chopticon High School Athletics belongs to the Southern Maryland Athletic Conference, and competes in Maryland Division 4A in state competitions. On March 24, 2014 the Chopticon varsity softball team ended the Northern varsity softball team's state record 77-game winning streak by a score of 5–3. The baseball team won the 2015 3A State Championship by defeating Mt. Hebron High School 1–0 in the championship game. The pitcher in that game, LJay Newsome, ended up being drafted by the Seattle Mariners in the 2015 MLB draft. In 2016, the softball program made their first state championship since 1985, however they lost 7–2 to Sherwood High School.

On June 12, 2017 Chopticon saw another alumnus get selected in the MLB draft. Former Catcher Robby Kidwell was drafted in the 36th round by the New York Mets.

== Notable alumni ==
- Jerome Adams, Class of 1992, 20th Surgeon General of the United States.
- James Kilpatrick
- Elisa Rae Shupe
- Ljay Newsome
