= Northern High School (Owings, Maryland) =

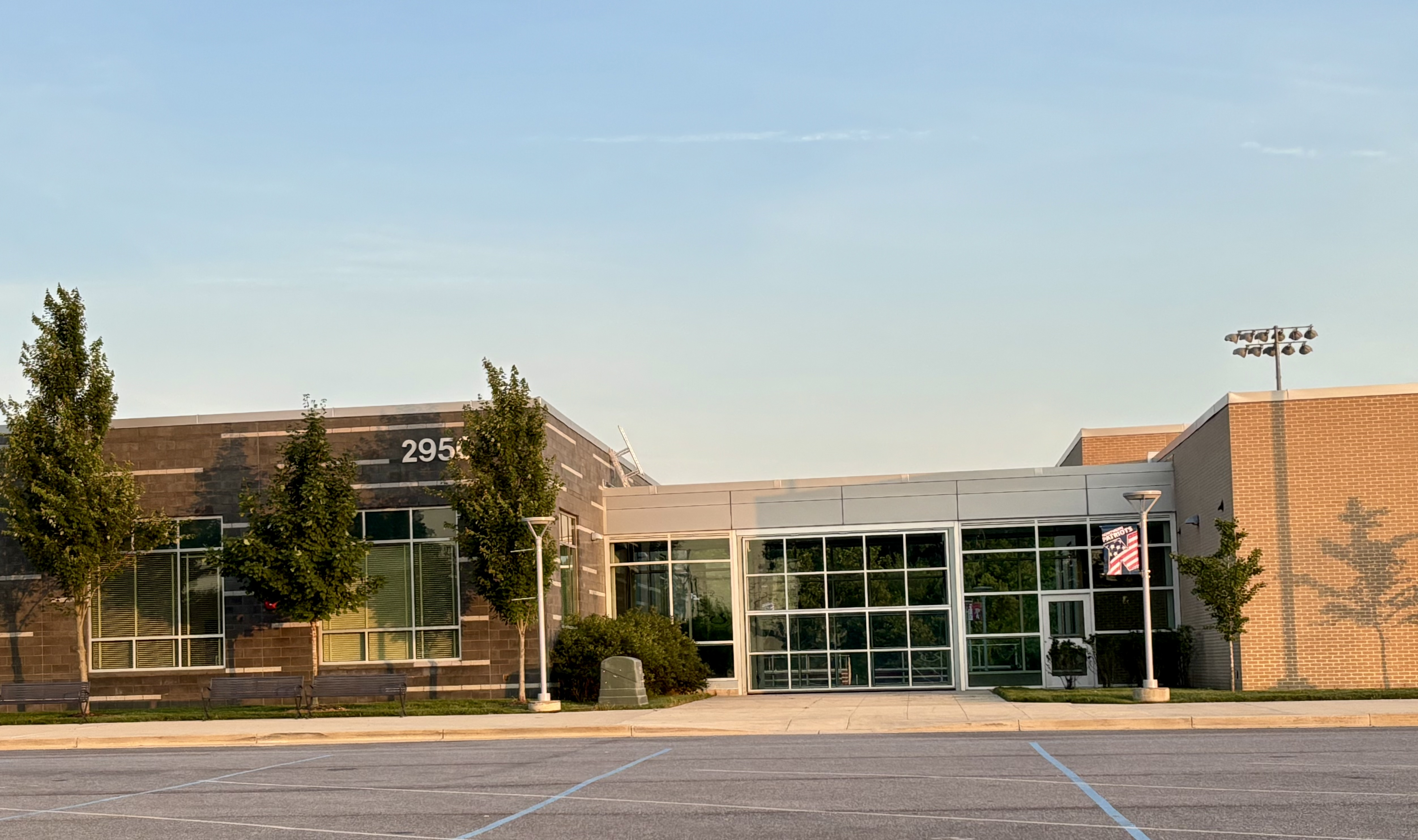
- Front of school

Location
- 2950 Chaneyville Road; Owings, Maryland 20736; United States; 38°41′9″N 76°39′8″W

Information
- Type: Public secondary school
- Founded: 1973
- Principal: Dr. Kevin Simmons
- Teaching staff: 79.67 (on an FTE basis)
- Grades: 9–12
- Enrollment: 1,478 (2024–25)
- Student to teacher ratio: 18.55
- Colors: Red, white and blue
- Athletics conference: Southern Maryland Athletic Conference (SMAC)
- Nickname: Patriots
- Rival: Huntingtown High School
- Newspaper: Patriot Press
- Website: nhs.calvertnet.k12.md.us

Northern High School is a public secondary school located in Owings, Calvert County, Maryland, United States. In the 2024–25 school year, 1,478 students attended the school. It serves students who reside primarily in the communities of Owings, Dunkirk, Sunderland, Chesapeake Beach, and North Beach.

== History ==
Northern High School opened halfway through the 1973–1974 school year.

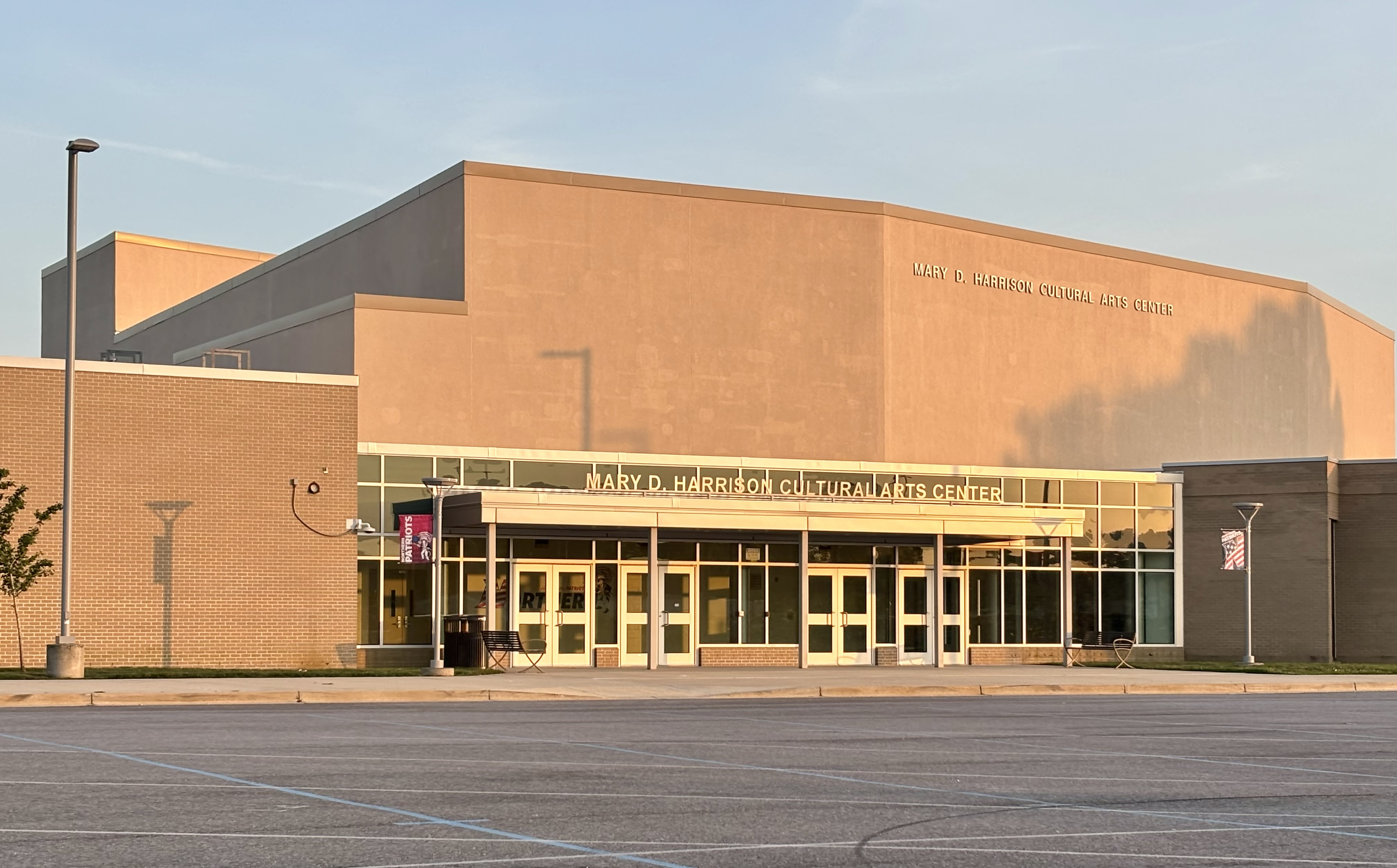
Harrison Cultural Arts Center

On July 26, 2016, the Calvert County Board of Education awarded a replacement contract to J.A. Scheibel Construction Inc. of Huntingtown, Md., for the total replacement of Northern High School. This project was expected to cost $69,382,000 and was completed in December 2018. The phased construction was to implement a 244,090-square-foot (22,677 m^{2}) building that could house up to 1,500 students. The contract also covered renovations to the Mary D. Harrison Cultural Arts Center, which is attached to the school. Construction of the main building was completed in December 2018, and classes moved to the new building the following month. The administration wing was completed during the 2019–2020 school year.

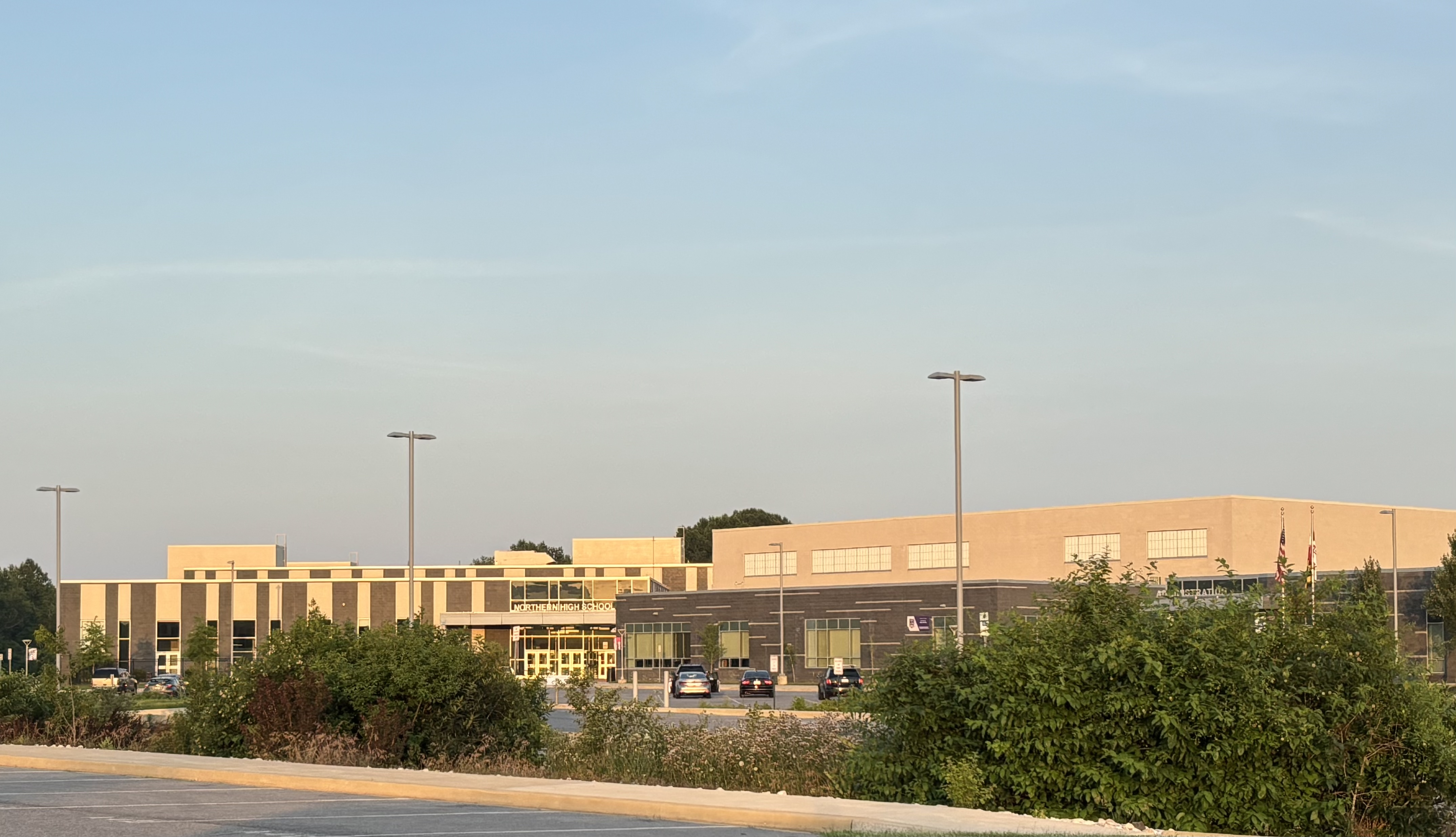
School campus

During the second half of the '88–'89 school year, the Fox television network filmed a pilot episode of an unnamed television series at the school.

== Music ==
The Northern High School Marching Patriots have won numerous awards and competitions. At USBands events, the band became 1A state champions in 2021, 2022, and 2024, and 2A state champions in 2019. The band won national 1AA Champions in 2022 and 2025. In 2025, the band tied with Chopticon High School to become group 1A co-state champions at the USBands Maryland and Virginia State Championships at Calvert Hall College High School. A week later, the band became the Group 1AA national champions at the USBands I A, IV A, V A, & I Open Championships in Linden, Pennsylvania.

== Demographics ==
The demographic breakdown of the 1,478 students enrolled for the 2024–25 school year was:

- Male – 50%
- Female – 50%
- Native American/Alaskan – 0%
- Asian – 2.4%
- Black – 11.5%
- Hispanic – 7.2%
- Native Hawaiian/Pacific islander – 0.2%
- White – 69.2%
- Multiracial – 10%

Students eligible to receive free lunch made up 17.6% of the population and students eligible to receive reduced price lunch made up for 3% of the population.

== Athletics ==
Northern High School is a member of the Southern Maryland Athletic Conference (SMAC). The following sports are currently offered by NHS.

Fall Sports:

- Cheerleading
- Cross Country
- Field Hockey
- Flag Football
- Football
- Golf
- Poms
- Boys Soccer
- Girls Soccer
- UNIFIED Sports
- Volleyball

Winter Sports:

- Boys Basketball
- Girls Basketball
- Cheerleading
- Indoor Track
- Poms
- Swimming
- UNIFIED Sports
- Wrestling

Spring Sports:

- Baseball
- Boys Lacrosse
- Girls Lacrosse
- Softball
- Tennis
- Track & Field
- UNIFIED Sports

== AP Courses ==
The Calvert County Public Schools (CCPS) Offers a large amount of Advanced Placement (AP) courses. Most AP courses have prerequisites, and not all AP courses offered by CCPS are offered by Northern High School. The following courses are offered by the CCPS.

- AP Art History
- AP Biology
- AP Calculus 1
- AP Calculus 2
- AP Chemistry
- AP English Language and Composition
- AP English Literature and Composition
- AP Environmental Science
- AP European History
- AP French Language and Culture
- AP Human Geography
- AP Music Theory
- AP Psychology
- AP Spanish Language and Culture
- AP Statistics
- AP Studio – Drawing
- AP Studio - Three-Dimensional Design
- AP Studio - Two-Dimensional Design
- AP Culinary Consumption
- AP United States Government and Politics
- AP United States History
- AP World History
- AP Computer Science Coding
- AP Computer Science Principles
- AP Microeconomics
- AP Physics 1
- AP Physics 2
- AP Physics C: Electricity & Magnetism
- AP Physics C: Mechanics

AP Courses have an end of year test to determine whether you get college credit for the course. These tests are administered by College Board and typically cost $99, but CCPS covers AP test fees for students.

== Dual Enrollment ==
CCPS and Northern High School offers the opportunity for students to dual enroll at the College of Southern Maryland (CSM). When students successfully pass the course, they are dual enrolled in, and pass a final exam, the fees for which are covered by CCPS, they will receive college credits from CSM. The following courses are offered for dual enrollment.

- Basic Principles of Speech Communications
- General Chemistry I w/Lab
- Composition & Rhetoric
- Composition & Literature
- Honors Composition and Rhetoric
- Honors Composition and Literature
- Environmental Science w/Lab
- Global History 1500 – present
- The United States Since 1877
- Introduction to Statistics
- Precalculus, Algebra, & Trigonometry
- Calculus I
- Calculus II
- Calculus III
- Music Appreciation
- Fundamentals of Physics I w/Lab
- Honors Physics
- General Psychology

These courses may also satisfy graduation requirements.

== Early College ==
CCPS also offers early college opportunities for students who meet the following requirements. Students must have completed 10th grade and be at least 16 years old, must have a cumalitve high school GPA of above 3.0, must complete placement tests, which can only be taken once, in English, Reading, or Mathematics, and achieve a score that falls within the "College Level Range," as determined by CSM. In rare cases, younger students may qualify for early college. Students interested can speak with their counselor. The benefits of early college are that students can earn college credits while still in high school, experience college while still living at home, expand course options once high school requirements have been completed, demonstrate on college admissions applications that students can succeed in college-level work, transfer credits to other colleges and universities, explore personal interests that might not be available in high school, and getting involved with college and community activities. Dual enrollment students do not have to pay for their tuition or fees. These costs are covered by CCPS.

== Rivalry ==
Northern's major rival is Huntingtown High School.

== Notable alumni ==
- Ryan Meisinger, baseball player
- Jaelyn Duncan, football player
- Jordana (musician), musician
- Wax, rapper, singer, songwriter, musician, producer, and comedian
