= Patuxent High School =

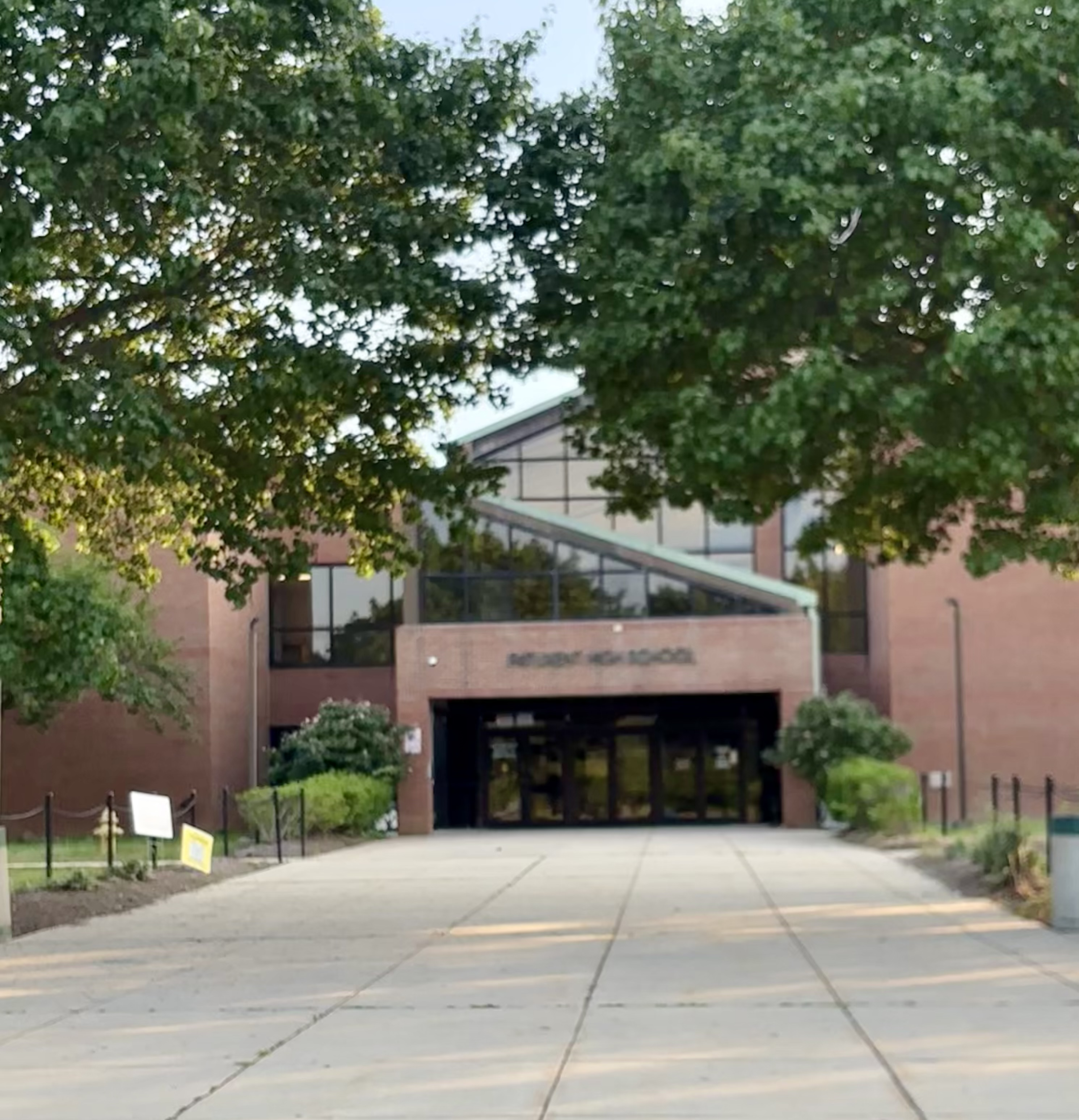
- Front entrance

Location
- 12485 Southern Connector Boulevard; Lusby, Maryland; United States; 38.35507°N 76.44035°W

Information
- Type: Public Secondary
- Motto: "The Heart & Future of Our Community"
- Established: 1996
- School district: Calvert County Public Schools
- Faculty: 63.50 (on an FTE basis)
- Grades: 9–12
- Enrollment: 1,008 (2023-24)
- Campus: Small Suburban
- Colors: Forest Green, Black and White
- Athletics: Southern Maryland Athletic Conference
- Mascot: Panther
- Website: Patuxent High Official Website

Patuxent High School ([pəˈtʌksənt] "puh-TUCK-sunt") is a comprehensive, four-year public high school in Lusby, Calvert County, Maryland, United States. The school draws from the communities of Cove Point, the Chesapeake Ranch Estates, Drum Point and Solomons.

== Athletics ==
Patuxent is a 1A school that competes in the Southern Maryland Athletic Conference (SMAC).

== Notable alumni ==
- Joey Jett, professional skateboarder
- Robert McClain, American football cornerback

== Gallery ==
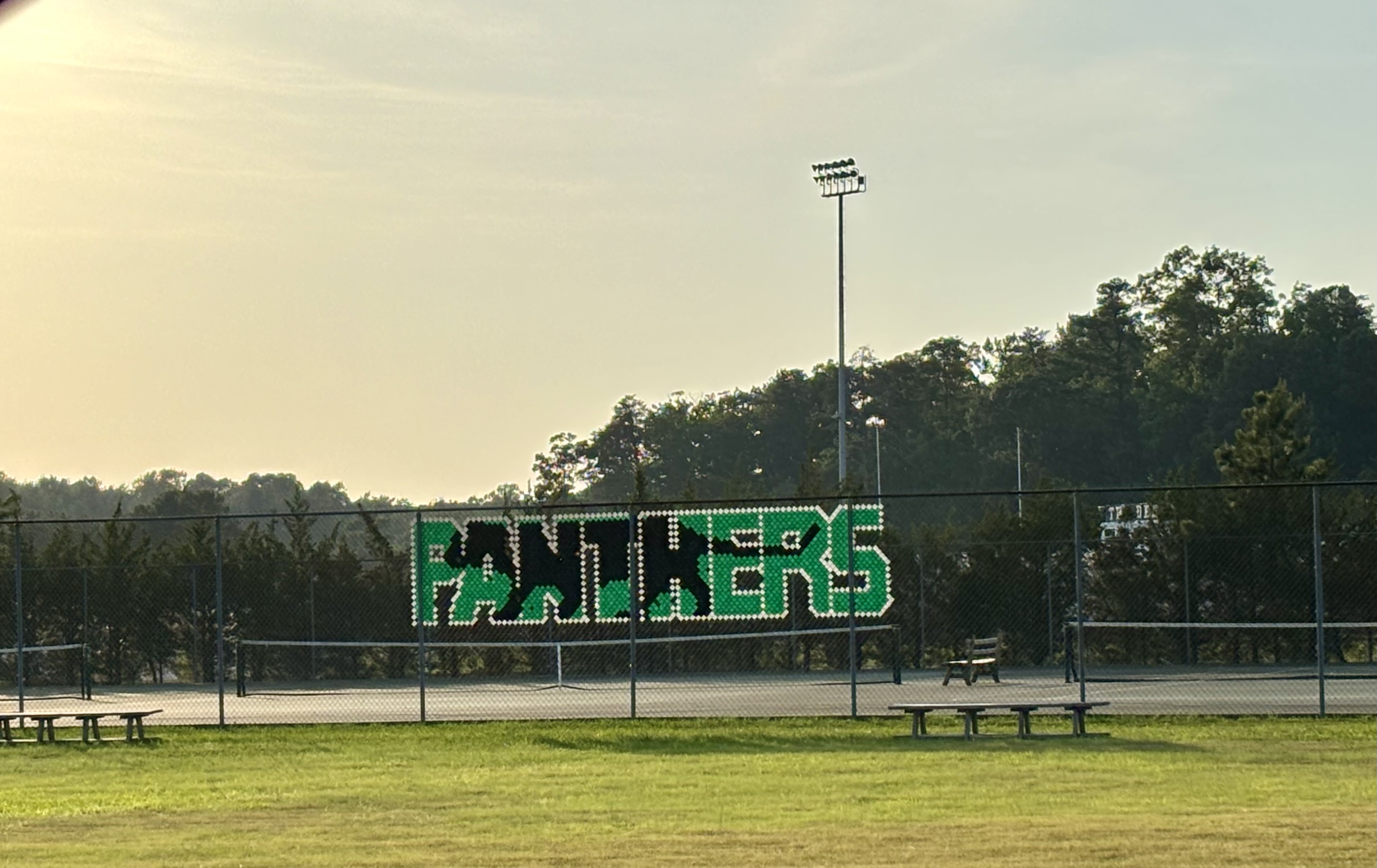
Tennis courts

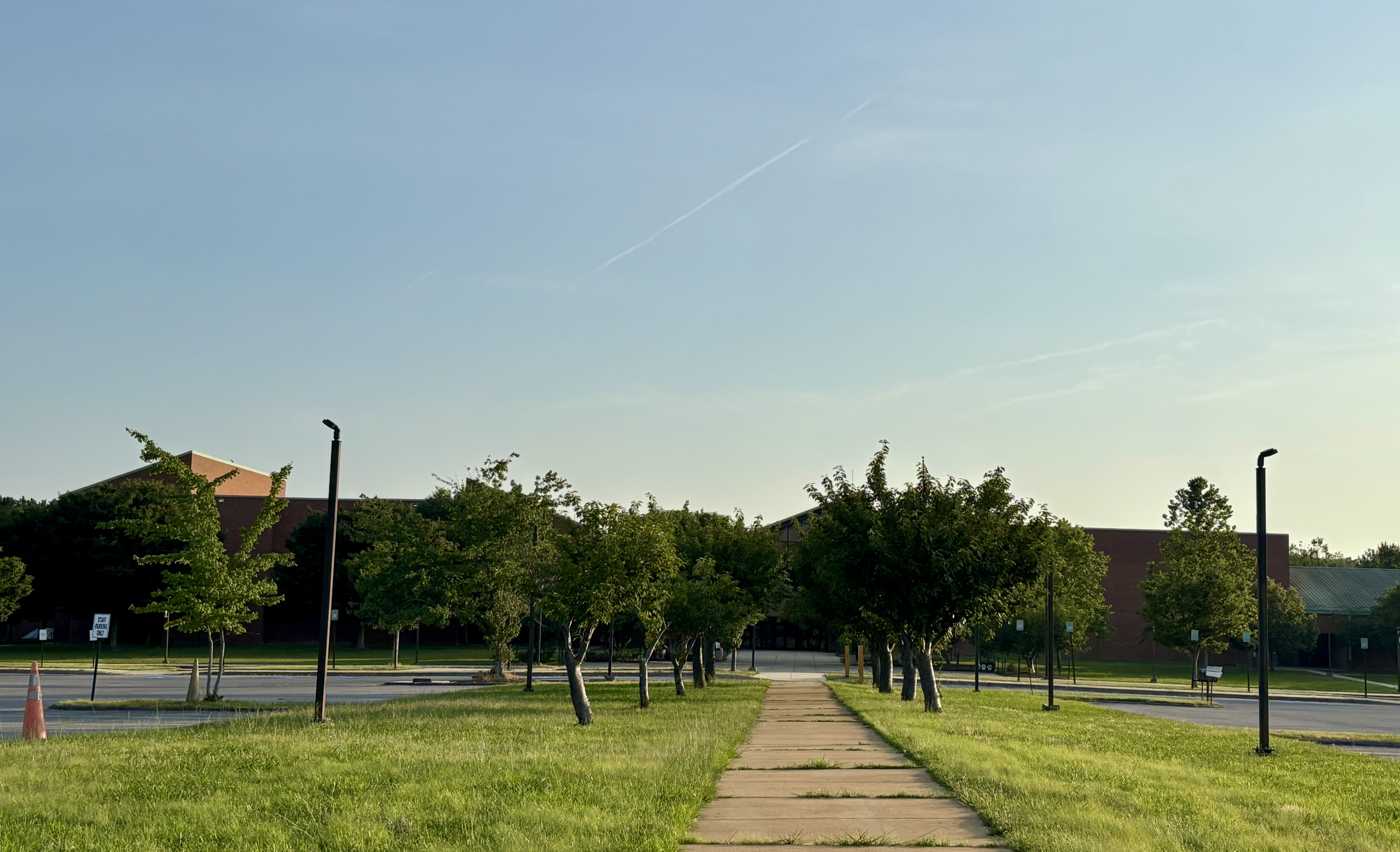
Tree-lined campus

Former logo, 2007
