= Chaneyville, Maryland =

Unincorporated community in Maryland, U.S.

Coordinates: 38°41′30″N 76°38′24″W

Chaneyville is a small, rural unincorporated community located at the crossroads of MD 4, Chaneyville Road, and Fowler Road in Calvert County, Maryland, United States. It is generally considered to be a part of either Owings or Dunkirk, two larger communities. Chaneyville is home to the Fairview Library branch of Calvert Library, a building that formerly housed the county's tourist welcome center as well as the Fairview School.

== Gallery ==
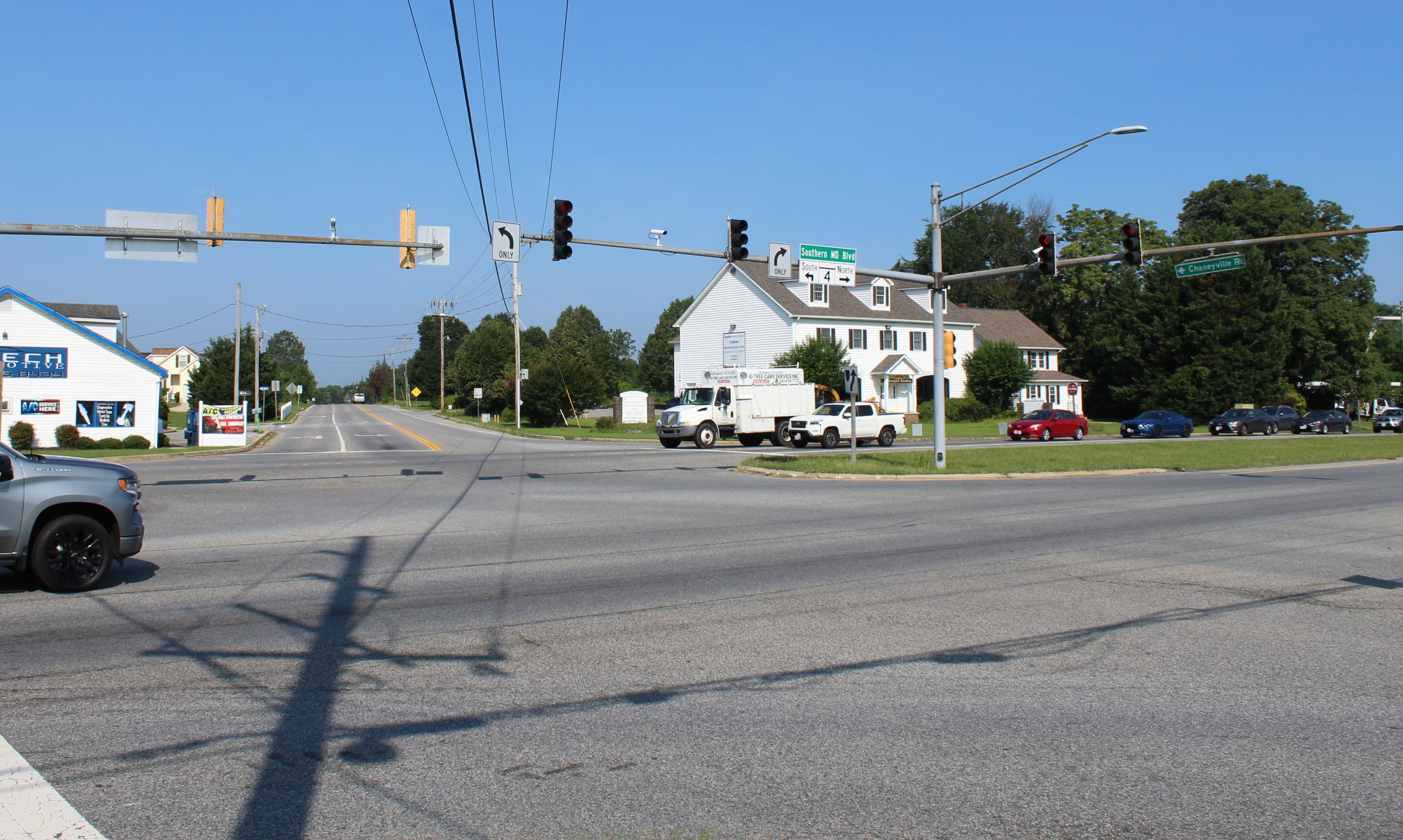

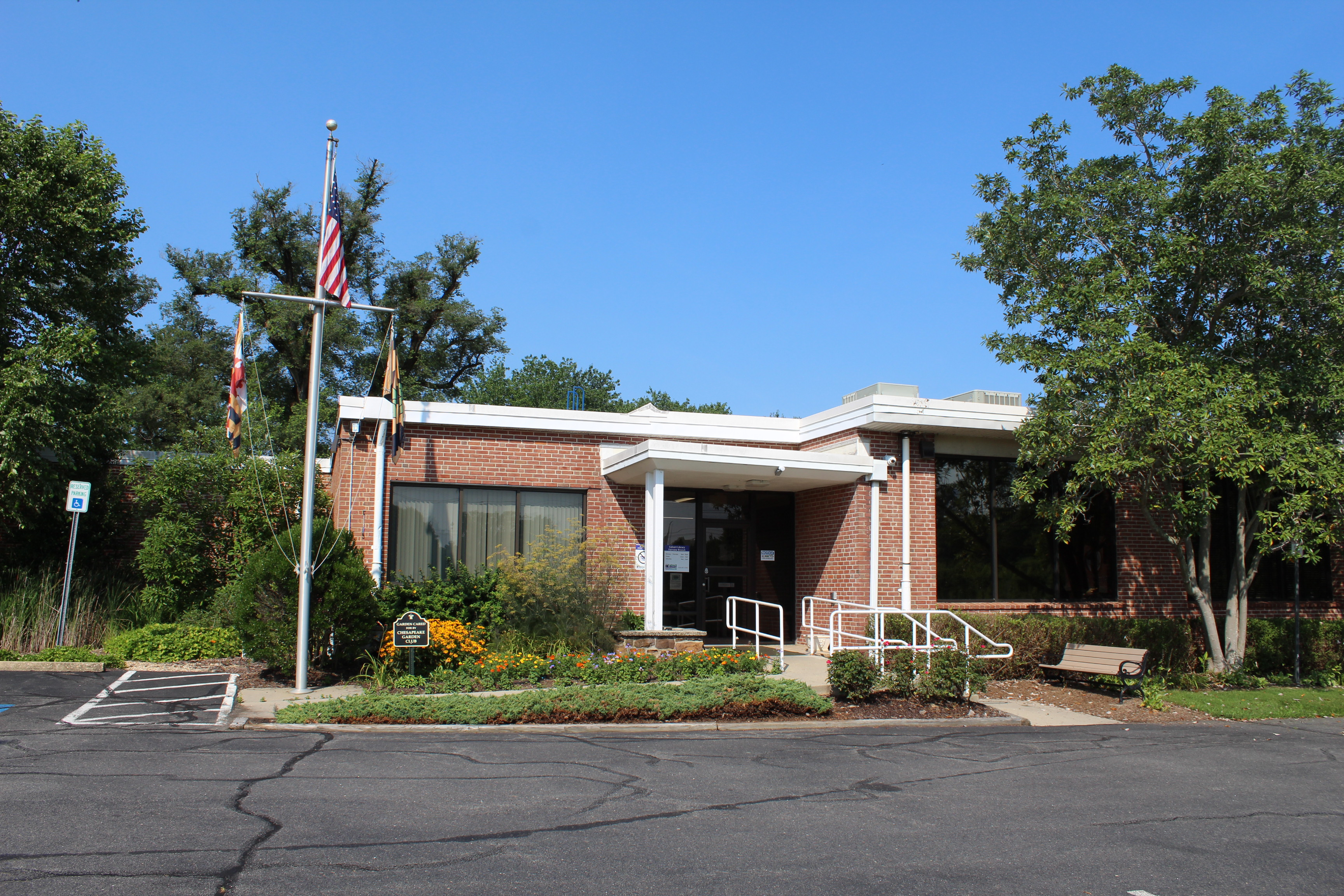
