= Huntingtown, Maryland =

- Census-designated place
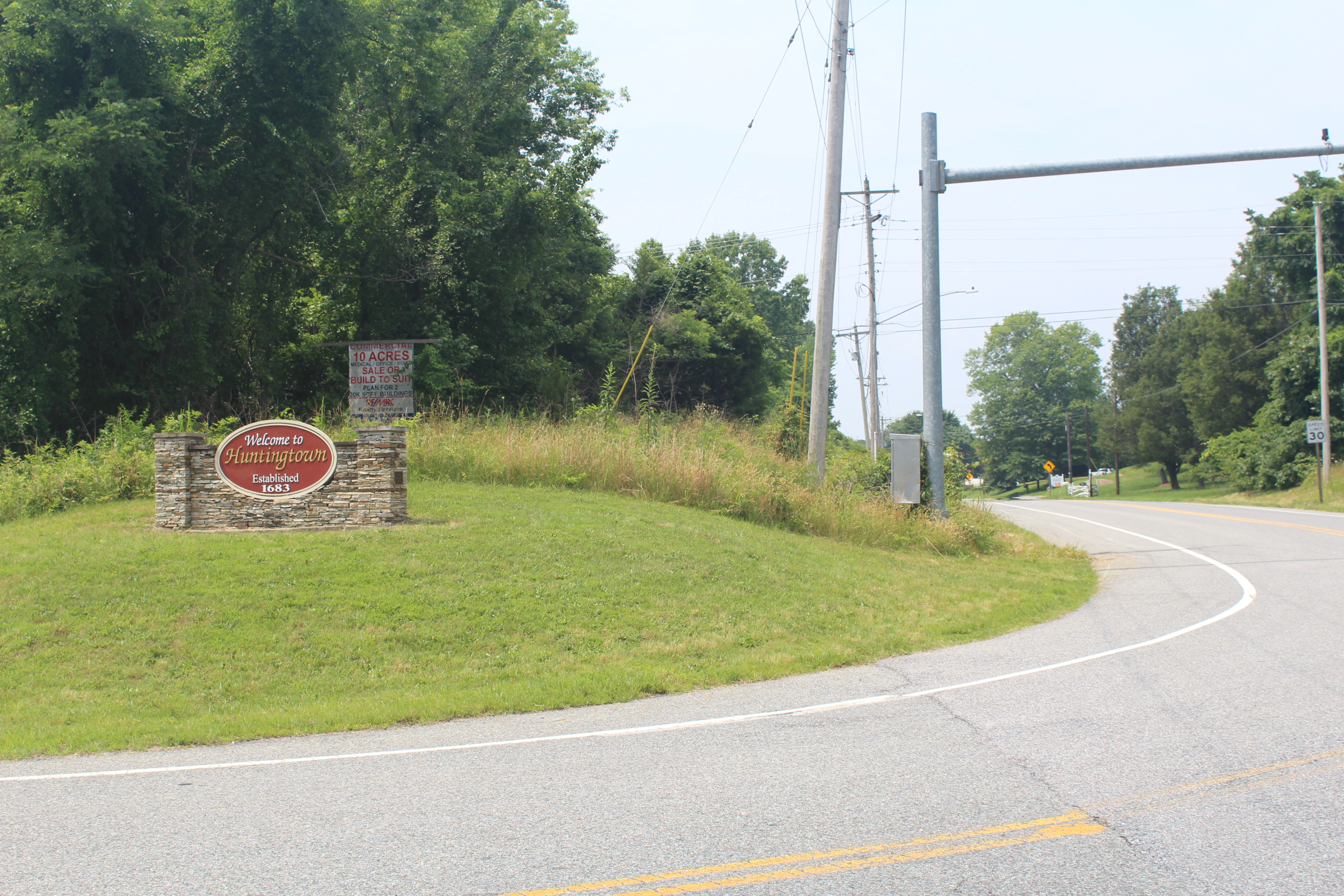

- Location of Huntingtown, Maryland
- Coordinates: 38°36′57″N 76°37′0″W
- Country: United States
- State: Maryland
- County: Calvert

Area
  - Total: 8.10 sq mi (20.97 km^{2})
  - Land: 8.07 sq mi (20.90 km^{2})
  - Water: 0.023 sq mi (0.06 km^{2})
- Elevation: 174 ft (53 m)

Population (2020)
  - Total: 3,545
  - Density: 439.2/sq mi (169.58/km^{2})
- Time zone: UTC−5 (Eastern (EST))
  - Summer (DST): UTC−4 (EDT)
- ZIP code: 20639
- Area code: 410
- FIPS code: 24-41037
- GNIS feature ID: 1852593

Huntingtown, established 1683, is a census-designated place (CDP) in Calvert County, Maryland, United States. The population was 3,311 at the 2010 census, up from 2,436 in 2000. Many large estate homes have recently been built in small developments off routes 2/4. It has a public high school called Huntingtown High. The Calverton School is located just south of the town center. State-operated commuter buses and private vanpools carry residents to Washington.

== Demographics ==
Historical population
Census	Pop.	Note	%±
2020	3,545		—
U.S. Decennial Census

=== 2020 census ===
As of the 2020 census, Huntingtown had a population of 3,545. The median age was 41.8 years. 24.9% of residents were under the age of 18 and 14.4% of residents were 65 years of age or older. For every 100 females there were 106.1 males, and for every 100 females age 18 and over there were 103.2 males age 18 and over.

0.0% of residents lived in urban areas, while 100.0% lived in rural areas.

There were 1,121 households in Huntingtown, of which 40.1% had children under the age of 18 living in them. Of all households, 72.7% were married-couple households, 8.0% were households with a male householder and no spouse or partner present, and 16.3% were households with a female householder and no spouse or partner present. About 11.1% of all households were made up of individuals and 5.4% had someone living alone who was 65 years of age or older.

There were 1,162 housing units, of which 3.5% were vacant. The homeowner vacancy rate was 1.6% and the rental vacancy rate was 11.5%.

Racial composition as of the 2020 census
Race	Number	Percent
White	2,617	73.8%
Black or African American	445	12.6%
American Indian and Alaska Native	10	0.3%
Asian	90	2.5%
Native Hawaiian and Other Pacific Islander	1	0.0%
Some other race	52	1.5%
Two or more races	330	9.3%
Hispanic or Latino (of any race)	138	3.9%

=== 2000 census ===
As of the census of 2000, there were 2,436 people, 768 households, and 668 families residing in the CDP. The population density was 296.3 inhabitants per square mile (114.4/km^{2}). There were 784 housing units at an average density of 95.4 per square mile (36.8/km^{2}). The racial makeup of the CDP was 79.84% White, 17.04% African American, 0.37% Native American, 0.78% Asian, 0.12% Pacific Islander, 0.29% from other races, and 1.56% from two or more races. Hispanic or Latino of any race were 0.86% of the population.

There were 768 households, out of which 48.6% had children under the age of 18 living with them, 75.5% were married couples living together, 8.5% had a female householder with no husband present, and 13.0% were non-families. 10.3% of all households were made up of individuals, and 4.4% had someone living alone who was 65 years of age or older. The average household size was 3.17 and the average family size was 3.42.

In the CDP, the population was spread out, with 32.1% under the age of 18, 5.2% from 18 to 24, 30.8% from 25 to 44, 24.0% from 45 to 64, and 8.0% who were 65 years of age or older. The median age was 36 years. For every 100 females, there were 97.2 males. For every 100 females age 18 and over, there were 92.0 males.

The median income for a household in the CDP was $81,672, and the median income for a family was $85,907. Males had a median income of $60,362 versus $35,962 for females. The per capita income for the CDP was $28,312. About 4.2% of families and 7.9% of the population were below the poverty line, including 12.7% of those under age 18 and 12.1% of those age 65 or over.

== Notable people ==
- Tom Clancy, author of bestselling political thrillers
- Doug Hill, ABC Channel 7 weatherman
