= Colross =

Georgian mansion in Princeton, New Jersey

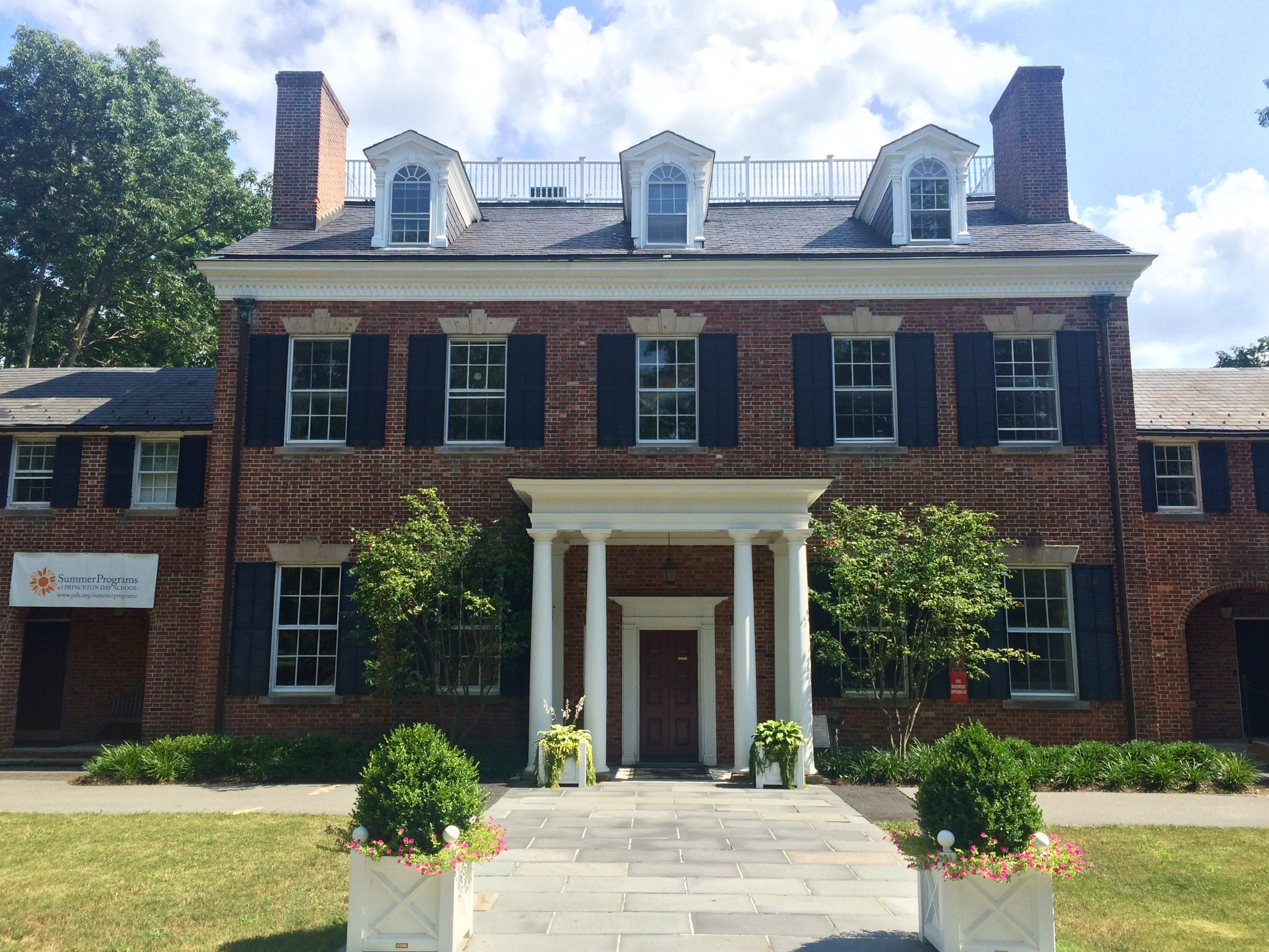
- Colross in 2015

General information
- Type: Mansion
- Architectural style: Georgian
- Location: Original location: Oronoco Street; Alexandria, Virginia, US Current location: Princeton Day School; Princeton, New Jersey, US, United States
- Coordinates: Original location: 38°48′37.72″N 77°3′3.13″W Current location: 40°21′43.92″N 74°41′17.88″W
- Construction started: 1799
- Client: John Potts; Jonathan Swift; Lee Massey Alexander; Thomson Francis Mason
- Owner: John Potts; Jonathan Swift; Lee Massey Alexander; Thomson Francis Mason; Arthur "Pen" Pendleton Mason; William Albert Smoot; John Munn; Dr. Geoffrey W. Rake; Princeton Day School

Colross (also historically known as Belle Air and Grasshopper Hall) is a Georgian style mansion built around 1800 as the center of a large plantation in what is now the Old Town neighborhood of Alexandria, Virginia, United States, and moved circa 1930 to Princeton, New Jersey, where it is currently the administration building of Princeton Day School.

The Colross property originally occupied the entire 1100 block of Oronoco Street; Alexandria merchant John Potts developed it as a plantation and began building the mansion in 1799–1800. In 1803, Jonathan Swift—also an Alexandria merchant and a city councilman—purchased the property and during his ownership continued constructing the mansion. After Swift died in 1824, Colross was purchased by Thomson Francis Mason, son of Thomson Mason and grandson of Founding Father George Mason of Gunston Hall. Mason served as a judge of the Criminal Court of the District of Columbia and as mayor of Alexandria. Mason, who made Colross his chief homestead, modified and enlarged the mansion. Colross served as the venue for several significant Mason family events,. According to local tradition, two children in the Mason family died on the property and were interred in the estate's burial vault. Successive owners of the Colross estate claimed it was haunted by the deceased Mason children. After successive ownerships, the area around Colross became heavily industrialized. The mansion was bought by John Munn in 1929; between that year and 1932, it was transported brick-by-brick to Princeton, where in 1958 it was sold to Princeton Day School, which uses it as a school administration building housing its admission and advancement offices.

The Colross mansion is a two-story, brick, Georgian-style structure that features an architectural plan similar to that of Mount Vernon and Woodlawn, and it was originally flanked by two wings. The front entrance is covered by a spacious Neoclassical portico that is supported by wooden Doric columns. The roof is topped by a balustraded deck and is further embellished by three dormer windows.

In 2005, after the original Colross site was purchased by a real estate development company, the city of Alexandria requested an excavation by archaeologists, who uncovered an underground domed brick cistern, evidence of slave outbuildings, the foundations of the estate's peripheral walls, and several ancillary structures.

== History ==
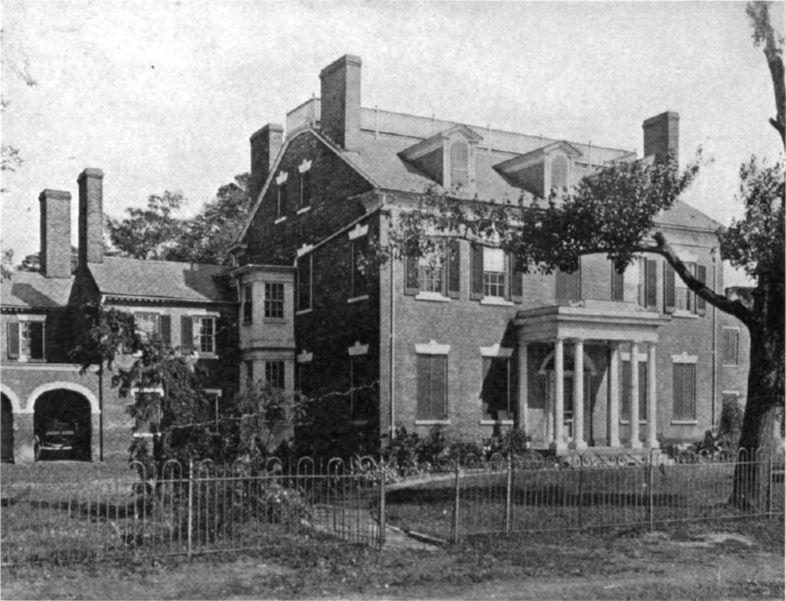
The mansion in 1916

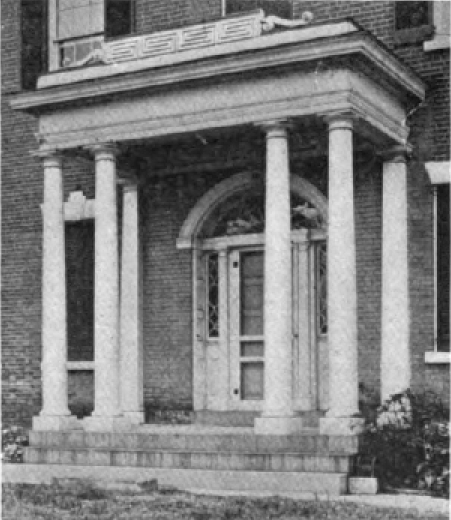
The front portico and main entryway

=== Virginia ===
The land on which Colross was first located was originally part of the Northern Neck Proprietary, a land grant that the exiled Charles II awarded to seven of his supporters in 1649 during the English Interregnum. Following the Restoration in 1660, Charles II finally ascended to the English throne. Charles II renewed the Northern Neck Proprietary grant in 1662, revised it in 1669, and again renewed the original grant favoring original grantee Thomas Colepeper, 2nd Baron Colepeper and Henry Bennet, 1st Earl of Arlington in 1672. In 1681, Bennet sold his share to Lord Colepeper, and Lord Colepeper received a new charter for the entire land grant from James II in 1688. Following the deaths of Lord Colepeper, his wife Margaret, and his daughter Katherine, the Northern Neck Proprietary passed to Katherine's son Thomas Fairfax, 6th Lord Fairfax of Cameron in 1719.

John Potts, a prominent Alexandria merchant, developed the Colross property as a forced-labor cash-crop farm. He began building a brick mansion on the property between 1799 and 1800. Potts encountered financial difficulties and placed the unfinished mansion on the market in 1801. In December 1803, Jonathan Swift, a merchant and Freemason, bought the property for $9,000. Swift purchased Colross for his bride, Anne Roberdeau, daughter of Brigadier General Daniel Roberdeau. Some sources say Swift's wife reportedly named the estate Belle Air; according to other sources, Swift referred to his estate as both "Belle Air" and "Grasshopper Hall". Swift presided over Alexandria City Council from 1822 through 1823. His wife, two daughters, and three sons lived with him at the mansion. As Alexandria expanded, Colross evolved from a rural plantation into an urban estate. Between 1791 and 1847, the city of Alexandria was a part of Alexandria County within the District of Columbia. Swift continued to construct the mansion. After his death in 1824, the estate transferred to the ownership of Lee Massey Alexander and his sister, Mrs. Chapman. The Alexander family owned the estate for a brief period; they renamed it "Colross".

Colross was then purchased by Thomson Francis Mason, a prominent jurist, lawyer, councilman, judge of the Criminal Court of the District of Columbia, and mayor of Alexandria between 1827 and 1830. Mason was the eldest son of Thomson Mason, and was the grandson of U.S. Founding Father George Mason of Gunston Hall. According to Mason's daughter Virginia Mason Davidge, her father won Colross "at a game of cards" from Lee Massey Alexander. Mason used Colross as his chief homestead and made substantial modifications and additions to it. Mason built a 10 ft (3.0 m) high brick wall around the exterior of the Colross property. Around the same time Mason acquired Colross, he built Huntley in Fairfax County, Virginia as a rural retreat and summer villa. Mason's son, Arthur "Pen" Pendleton Mason, later inherited the Colross estate. Pen Mason was married to Mary Ellen Campbell, a daughter of John Archibald Campbell, an Associate Justice of the Supreme Court of the United States. Orlando B. Willcox, who later served as a Union Army general, visited Colross on several occasions around 1851; he described it as a "fine house and ground and the chief residence of the Masons of Alexandria, much frequented by officers of the army". Willcox also remarked on the "hospitality and civility of the head of the house", Pen Mason's mother, Elizabeth "Betsey" Clapham Price.

During the American Civil War, Colross was seized by Union authorities. According to local tradition and to Alexandria resident Julian Taylor, at least two Union deserters were executed with their backs against the estate's high brick exterior wall. In addition, a "famous 'bounty jumper'" by the name of Downey was also shot and killed against the wall after being captured by his own soldiers. Local traditions also tell of the ghost of a soldier who haunts the former location of the estate's brick perimeter wall.

William Albert Smoot, a lumber merchant and coal businessman, purchased Colross from the Mason family and lived there with his family between 1885 and 1917. Smoot's wife was a member of the Alexander family, and was therefore a descendant of the estate's former owners. While there, the Smoots' daughter Betty wrote, "the grounds included a whole square block and were enclosed with an ancient brick wall ten feet in height". The Smoots' son William Albert later served as mayor of Alexandria from 1922 to 1930.

The parents of Cornell University professor and activist Alice Cook lived at the then-dilapidated Colross with her father's superior from the Southern Railway. Her father worked for the railroad's bookkeeping department. Cook spent her early childhood at the house. In c. 1913, when Cook was about ten, her mother took her to Colross for a visit. She remarked that Colross "had no gaslights, and running water only in the kitchen", and that the house "stood in the midst of railroad tracks". Cook also said the house's adjacent stables still had horses, the "elegant plaster ceilings" remained intact, and "great oak doors" still stood within the house's main doorway behind the white columns of the front portico.

In 1917, another lumber merchant, William Hoge, acquired the mansion. Under similar circumstances to those of nearby Abingdon, properties surrounding Colross underwent industrialization with the construction of a warehouse complex and ancillary industrial buildings associated with Alexandria Hay & Grain. The mansion at Colross became a storage facility within a lumber yard operated by another planing mill owner. In 1927, the mansion and the adjacent warehouses were substantially damaged by a tornado, making the mansion uninhabitable.

=== New Jersey ===
Between 1929 and 1932, John Munn purchased the mansion, dismantled it, and shipped the structure brick-by-brick to Princeton, New Jersey, where it was restored. Following Munn's death in 1956, Colross was purchased by Dr. Geoffrey W. Rake. After Rake died in 1958, Colross was sold to Princeton Day School. The mansion became the school's administrative building, which it remains to this day. As of 2026, Colross houses the admission and advancement offices of Princeton Day School, and serves as a venue for the institution's events.

In Alexandria, the mansion's remaining brick foundation was buried beneath a slab of reinforced concrete for over 50 years. Structures on the site have since included a large 50-truck garage, Andy's Car Wash, a Dominion Virginia Power substation, and the Hennage Creative Printers facility.

== Architecture ==
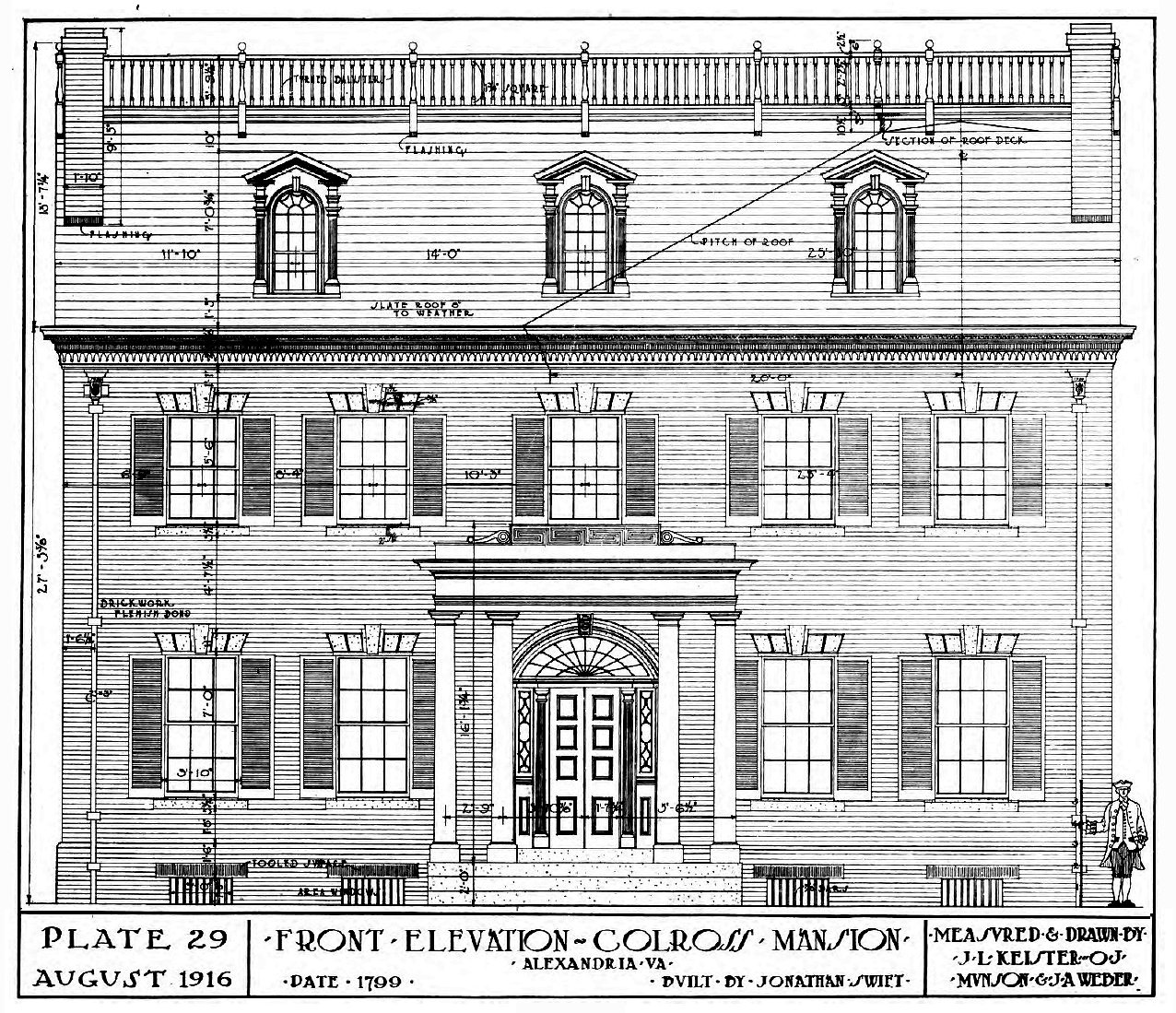
Architectural drawing of the front elevation of Colross

The mansion at Colross was built in the Georgian architectural style between 1799 and 1800. It is a two-story brick house featuring a rectangular architectural plan, which was originally flanked by two wings. Colross features wide halls and spacious rooms. One wing housed facilities for the estate's service staff; the other wing served as a carriage shed. Colross' architectural plan is similar to that of nearby estates Mount Vernon and Woodlawn, and is an example of the country house style of American colonial architecture common in Maryland and Virginia. It has been described as the "largest and most beautiful mansion ever erected in Alexandria". The Colross property originally occupied the entire 1100 block of Oronoco Street. The grounds of the estate also contained ancillary outbuildings.

The exterior brick walls of the mansion are laid in a Flemish bond pattern, exhibiting a "well proportioned width" of mortar joint between the bricks. Two sets of double inside chimneys extend above the roofline on each side of the mansion's main structure. The front façade of the mansion's main structure, which originally faced Oronoco Street in Alexandria, is five bays wide and contains the house's front entrance at the first floor's center bay. The front entrance is covered by a spacious Neoclassical architecture style portico, which is supported by two sets of double wooden doric columns at the front and engaged columns on the brick façade. The portico's frieze is subordinated to the architrave. The mansion's front door is topped by a leaded fanlight in the shape of a segmented arch. Leaded sidelights flank both sides of the main doorway. All of the mansion's windows feature colonial-style lintels.

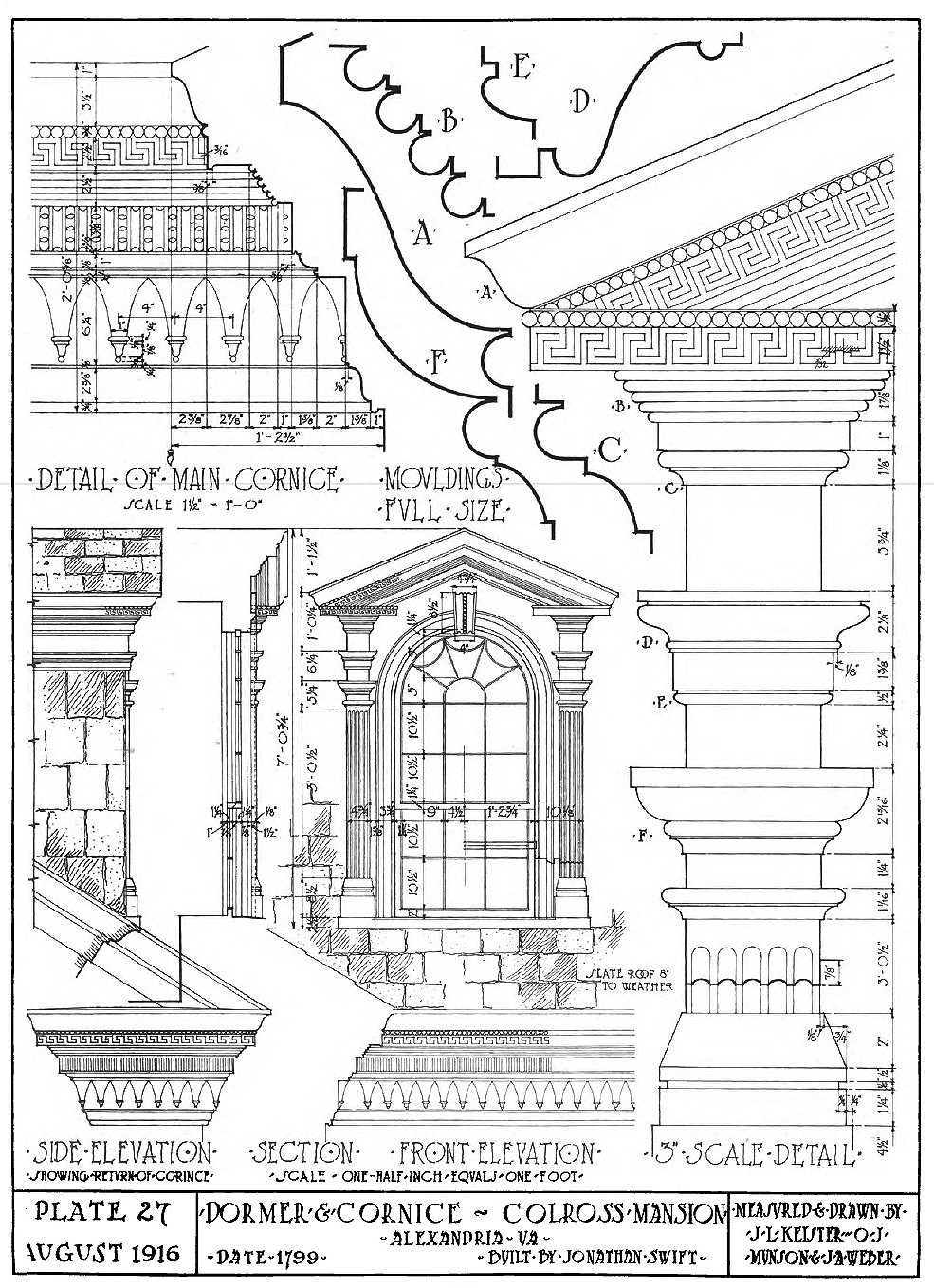
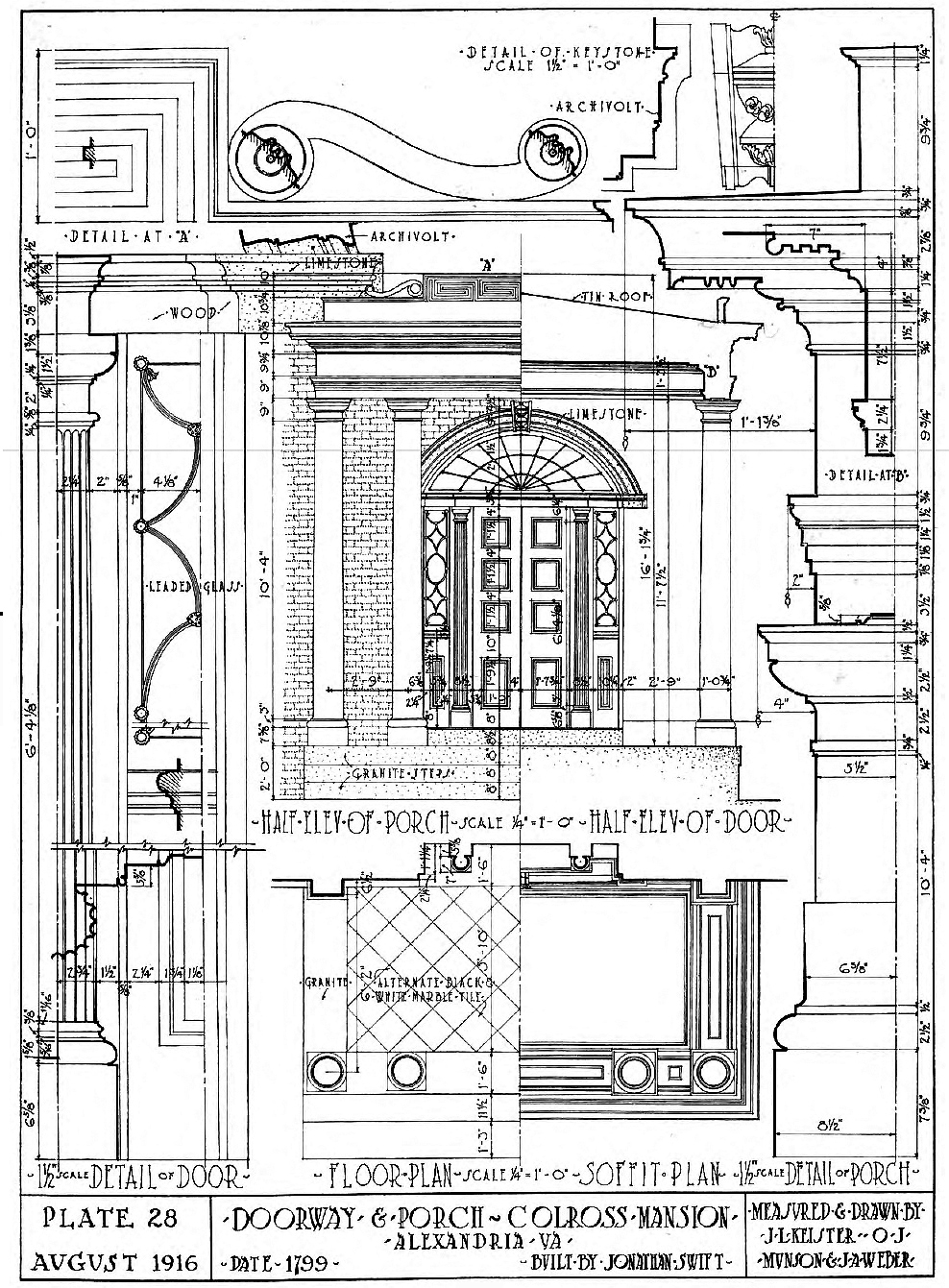
Architectural details of Colross

The mansion's roof is covered by gray slate and is further embellished with three dormer windows facing from the home's front façade. The roof is topped by a balustraded deck. Similar moulding contours were used at varying scales throughout the mansion's exterior construction. The mansion's cornice is composed of ornamented moldings.

To the north of the mansion was a garden, which was purportedly well known for its boxwoods, lilacs, and roses. The garden remained through the ownership of the Smoot family. A winding path led from the mansion to a large burial vault, which was closed by a great iron lock. According to members of the Smoot family, the lock to the burial vault would "never stay locked more than three days" at a time. A vase of urn stood in the front lawn of the mansion; according to tradition this marked the location where Pocahontas was baptized. The urn remained in its location throughout the American Civil War and was later acquired by the Association for the Preservation of Virginia Antiquities.

== Archeological excavation ==
The former Colross land tract on the 1100 block of Oronoco Street, which is bounded by North Fayette, Oronoco, Henry, and Pendleton streets, was purchased in 2003 by Diamond Properties, a real estate development company with plans to build a mixed-use mid-rise luxury condominium project called Monarch Condominium. In 2005, Alexandria's Archaeological Protection Code requirement forced Diamond Properties to halt its construction to allow for an archaeological excavation of the Colross site. The excavation occurred between March and June 2005, as mandated by the city of Alexandria. Diamond Properties paid R. Christopher Goodwin & Associates Inc., a cultural resource management firm, about $100,000 to explore the site for historical artifacts and to ensure all burial plots had been removed.

While only a few artifacts were recovered, historians said the dig offered a clearer view of early 19th-century life at Colross. Discoveries included an underground domed brick cistern that served as a water purification system and evidence that enslaved people lived in outbuildings on the Colross estate. Archaeologists also discovered the mansion's original basement floor, which was laid in a herringbone bond. Evidence of the estate's exterior walls, the foundations of the smokehouse, stables, and a burial vault were also unearthed. In the northwestern portion of the property, what is thought to have been the foundation of a rectangular burial vault was found. No burial remains were discovered. All interments were presumably removed in the early 20th century. Thomson Francis Mason was originally interred at the Colross graveyard in 1838, as were two of his daughters. Subsequent residents had their remains reinterred at Christ Church Episcopal Cemetery in Alexandria. According to the Alexandria Economic Development Partnership, the delay in construction caused 79 condominium buyers to abandon their purchases.

== Significant Mason family events ==
The Colross estate was the location for several significant events involving the Mason family. Sarah Elizabeth Mason, a daughter of Thomson Francis Mason and his wife Elizabeth Clapham Price, married St. George Tucker Campbell at Colross on November 17, 1841. Virginia Mason, another daughter of Thomson and Elizabeth married William Hathorn Stewart Davidge at Colross on February 1, 1853. Colross was also the venue for the funeral of Mrs. Virginia King, wife of Dr. Benjamin King, on December 31, 1850. Mrs. King was a sister of Mrs. Judge Mason.

According to local tradition, two small Mason children, William and Ann, were playing in the estate's yard when a storm arrived. William took shelter in the estate's chicken coop but the wind toppled the structure, killing him. Soon after William's death, his sister Ann drowned in a bathtub at Colross. Both children were interred in the estate's burial vault in the garden. Successive residents at Colross, including members of the Smoot family, claimed the estate was haunted by the deceased Mason children; they reported hearing children "giggling, singing, and talking", and witnessed apparitions of children in pre-Civil War attire.

== Bibliography ==
- Brown, Charlotte (2013). Groveton. Mount Pleasant, South Carolina: Arcadia Publishing. ISBN 978-1-4671-2009-8. OCLC 847348805. Archived from the original on June 27, 2014 – via Google Books.
- Chapman, Sigismunda Mary Frances; Calvert, Helen Chapman; Conlyn, Helen Pearson Chapman (1946). A History of Chapman and Alexander Families. Richmond, Virginia: The Dietz Printing Company. OCLC 1722963. Archived from the original on June 27, 2014 – via Google Books.
- Coleman, Roy V. (1951). Liberty and Property. New York City: Scribner. OCLC 1020487. Archived from the original on October 22, 2020 – via Google Books.
- Combs, George K.; Anderson, Leslie; Downie, Julia M. (2012). Alexandria. Mount Pleasant, South Carolina: Arcadia Publishing. ISBN 978-0-7385-9238-1. OCLC 775415356. Archived from the original on June 27, 2014 – via Google Books.
- Cook, Alice H. (2000). A Lifetime of Labor: The Autobiography of Alice H. Cook. City University of New York, New York City: The Feminist Press. ISBN 978-1-55861-257-0. OCLC 223109205. Archived from the original on June 27, 2014 – via Google Books.
- Crew, Harvey W.; Webb, William Bensing; Wooldridge, John (1892). Centennial History of the City of Washington, D. C.: With Full Outline of the Natural Advantages, Accounts of the Indian Tribes, Selection of the Site, Founding of the City ... to the Present Time. Dayton, Ohio: Published for H. W. Crew by the United Brethren Publishing House. OCLC 2843595. Archived from the original on November 18, 2016 – via Google Books.
- Harrison, Mrs. Burton (1912). Recollections Grave and Gay. New York City: C. Scribner's Sons. OCLC 1598709. Archived from the original on June 27, 2014 – via Google Books.
- Lee, Marguerite du Pont (2009). Virginia Ghosts. Baltimore: Genealogical Publishing Company. ISBN 978-0-8063-5095-0. OCLC 50266955. Archived from the original on June 27, 2014 – via Google Books.
- Munske, Roberta R.; Kerns, Wilmer L., eds. (2004). Hampshire County, West Virginia, 1754–2004. Romney, West Virginia: The Hampshire County 250th Anniversary Committee. ISBN 978-0-9715738-2-6. OCLC 55983178.
- Rice, Otis K. (2015). The Allegheny Frontier: West Virginia Beginnings, 1730-1830. Lexington, Kentucky: University Press of Kentucky. ISBN 978-0-8131-6438-0. OCLC 900345296. Archived from the original on May 27, 2016 – via Google Books.
- Rogers and Manson Company (1916). The Brickbuilder, Volume 25. Boston: Rogers and Manson Company. Archived from the original on June 27, 2014 – via Google Books.
- Rose, Cornelia Bruère (1976). Arlington County, Virginia: A History. Arlington County, Virginia: Arlington Historical Society. OCLC 2401541. Archived from the original on April 2, 2016 – via Google Books.
- Taylor, L. B. (2010). The Big Book of Virginia Ghost Stories. Mechanicsburg, Pennsylvania: Stackpole Books. ISBN 978-0-8117-0583-7. OCLC 539086905. Archived from the original on June 27, 2014 – via Google Books.
- Willcox, Orlando B. (1999). Robert Garth Scott (ed.). Forgotten Valor: The Memoirs, Journals, & Civil War Letters of Orlando B. Willcox. Kent, Ohio: Kent State University Press. ISBN 978-0-87338-628-9. OCLC 40881637. Archived from the original on June 27, 2014 – via Google Books.
- William and Mary Quarterly (April 1898). "The Northern Neck of Virginia". William and Mary Quarterly. 6 (4). Williamsburg, Virginia: College of William & Mary: 222–226. doi:10.2307/1915885. ISSN 0043-5597. JSTOR 1915885. OCLC 1607858.
