= Thomson Francis Mason =

American judge (1785–1838)

- Born: 1785; Gunston Hall, Fairfax County, Virginia
- Died: December 21, 1838 (aged 52–53); Alexandria, Virginia, US
- Education: College of New Jersey
- Occupations: lawyer, councilman, judge, and mayor of Alexandria, D.C.
- Spouse: Elizabeth "Betsey" Clapham Price
- Children: 9, including Arthur Pendleton Mason
- Father: Thomas Mason

Thomson Francis Mason (1785 – 21 December 1838) was an American lawyer, planter and politician who served as the Mayor of Alexandria, D.C. between 1827 and 1830, and as a justice of the peace for many years and briefly in the months before his death as a judge of the Washington, D.C., criminal court.

== Early life and education ==
Mason was born in 1785 at his grandfather George Mason's Gunston Hall plantation in Fairfax County, Virginia. He was the second eldest child and eldest son of General Thomson Mason (1759–1820) and his wife Sarah McCarty Chichester. Mason and his brother Richard Chichester Mason were primarily raised at Hollin Hall, their father's plantation house finished by Christmas 1788.

On October 24, 1805, Mason entered the College of New Jersey (now Princeton University) as a member of the junior class. That same year, he joined the American Whig-Cliosophic Society. Mason graduated from Princeton with honors and subsequently stayed to study law. He graduated from law school in 1807 and returned to Virginia.

== Career ==
Upon returning to Virginia, Mason began practicing law in Fairfax County. In the 1810 census, he and his brother Richard Chichester Mason were presumably two of the six males between 16 and 25 years old living with their father, whose household of 79 people included 13 whites, the remaining people presumably enslaved, who operated his plantation. In the 1820 census (also the year of his father's death), Thomson F. Mason's household included himself and his wife and daughter, a free white woman and a free black man, as well as seven enslaved people, including a boy and three girls younger than 14 years old. The 1830 census, the last of Thomson F. Mason's lifetime, indicates his household included sixteen people: three white males, eight white females and five slaves (only one, a girl, younger than 10).

=== Huntley and Colross ===
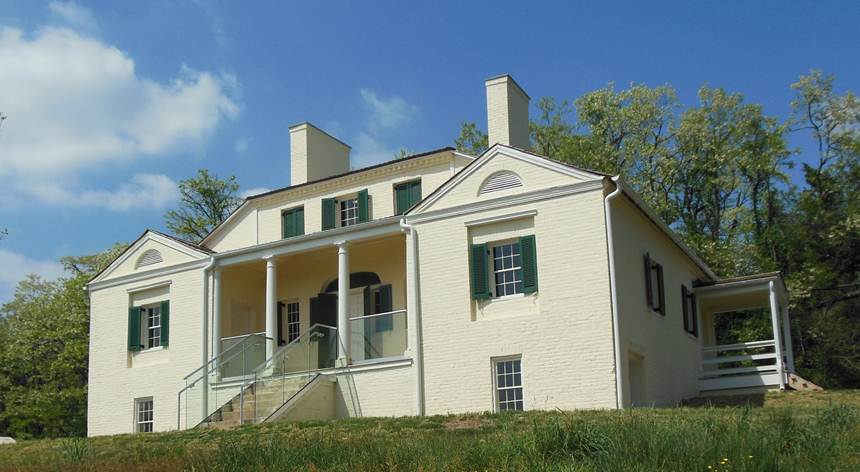
Huntley

When this man's grandfather George Mason died on October 7, 1792, Mason's father Thomson inherited a portion of the Gunston Hall estate, on which his father had helped him to build a house. Around 1817, Mason's father Thomson Mason divided the property into two plantations: Dogue Run farm for Mason's younger brother Richard Chichester Mason (1793–1869) and Hunting Creek farm for Mason. Mason constructed his secondary home known as Huntley between 1820 and 1825 on that Fairfax County property.

However, Huntley never served as a permanent residence for Mason, in part because his wife preferred town life and never grew fond of Huntley. Mason owned a number of houses in Alexandria and in the early 1830s acquired Colross, which had been one of the new capitol city's most sophisticated Federal style mansions and occupied an entire city block. John Potts, secretary of the Potomac Canal Company, had begun construction between 1799 and 1802, but ran into financial problems. Massachusetts born merchant, freemason and city councillor Jonathan Swift acquired the property, which he called "Belle Aire" and where he lived before his death in August 1824. While one chatty book of legends claimed Mason acquired Colross during a game of cards with Lee Massey Alexander, a later archeological report which examined Deed Book V-2:186 indicated a more traditional purchase. Mason renamed the property Colross (probably after a Scottish manor) added a brick wall around the property, as well as added rooms and a Greek Revival style portico. His brother Richard Chichester Mason, by contrast, moved his medical practice to his Fairfax County property and would serve several terms as one of Fairfax County's delegates in the Virginia House of Delegates.

=== Alexandria lawyer and politician ===
In 1812, Mason set up his law practice slightly to the north of his family's plantation in Alexandria, which was then located in Alexandria County in the newly established District of Columbia, although he also practiced in the Fairfax County courts. Mason's legal practice included prominent clients, perhaps the most recognizable today being Justice Bushrod Washington and Lawrence Lewis, the two executors of the estate of the late president George Washington. He also served as Justice of the Peace in Alexandra three times.

Thomson Francis Mason, as did his planter and banker uncle John Mason, played important roles during the 1820s (possibly on opposite sides) in the fight to retrocede Alexandria County from the District of Columbia back to Virginia (an effort which succeeded in 1847). Mason repeatedly won election to Alexandria city council through most of the 1820s, and fellow councilors elected him as Alexandria's mayor, for a three-year term between 1828 and 1830. Six months before his death in 1838, President Martin Van Buren appointed Mason as the first judge of the newly organized Criminal Court of the District of Columbia. Thomson F. Mason was also involved in several of Alexandria's transportation infrastructure projects. He served as president of and attorney for the Middle Turnpike Company for eleven years until resigning on July 16, 1838, to accept President Van Buren's judicial appointment. The Middle Turnpike, now known as the Leesburg Pike (Virginia State Route 7), was completed shortly after his death. As Alexandria's mayor and as chairman of the Alexandria Committee, Mason was involved with the construction of the Alexandria branch of the Chesapeake and Ohio Canal. The Alexandria Canal was later completed in 1843.

== Death and legacy ==
Mason died in Alexandria on December 21, 1838, at the age of 53, survived by his widow and several children. Originally interred in a burial vault his widow ordered at his Colross mansion in Alexandria, Mason's remains were reinterred near the end of the century at historic Christ Church's cemetery, in Old Town Alexandria. However, tragedy dogged the family, as his eldest son died at West Point in 1841, then his son Arthur Clapham died in 1844, and three servants accidentally drowned in the Potomac river. After three daughters married in 1850 (Sally, Ann Graham and Matilda), the Mason household only included sons John F. and Arthur Mason, and their sisters Caroline.

Mason's widow Betsey completed Colross and remained active in the community, including as the Vice-Regent for Virginia of the Mount Vernon Ladies Association (which secured a contract to acquire Mount Vernon in 1858). Two decades after Mason's death, his widow unsuccessfully attempted to sell Huntley and its accompanying Hunting Creek farm. When she was unable to sell the property, Betsey transferred ownership on November 7, 1859, to her sons John "Frank" Francis Mason and Arthur "Pen" Pendleton Mason. During the Civil War, Union forces occupied Colross and used its grounds for a large tent hospital. Betsey Mason returned to Colross after the conflict and lived with her daughter Caroline and another woman named T.T. Rhett, possibly related to the husband of her daughter Matilda (who died in 1871, as did her mother).

Arthur Pendleton Mason, who married a daughter of Justice John Archibald Campbell and became a Confederate officer during the American Civil War, inherited and lived at Colross. He sold it to the locally prominent Smoot family, which used it as their business office as well as continued to entertain at the house. However, between 1929 and 1932, that large and historic Georgian style house was physically moved brick by brick to Princeton, New Jersey, to permit further commercial development of the 1100 Oronoco Street block which it had occupied. In 1958 the rebuilt structure was sold to the Princeton Day School, which currently uses it as an administrative building. In 2005 the City of Alexandria authorized an archeological survey of the site, which unearthed a cistern and evidence of slave residences, among other structures.

In 1989, the Fairfax County Park Authority acquired Huntley. The restored main house is open for regular tours on Saturdays, April through October, and hosts special programs and events. Renovation of the nearby tenant house was completed in 2017 and it is used as a visitor welcome center for tours and programs.

== Marriage and children; relations and ancestry ==
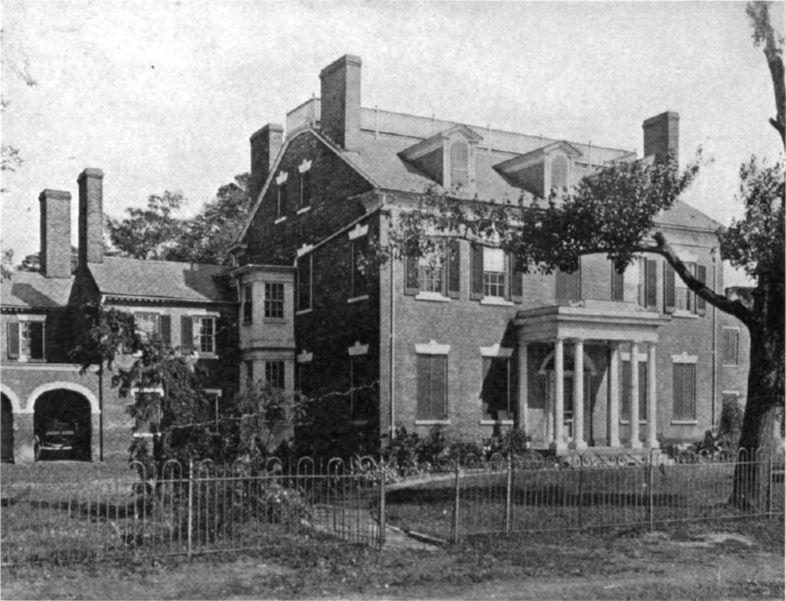
Colross

Mason married Elizabeth "Betsey" Clapham Price of Leesburg, Virginia, on 19 November 1817. He and Elizabeth had ten children, five sons and five daughters:

- Ann Graham Florence Mason Rhett (died 1883)
- Arthur Mason (died 28 May 1835)
- Sarah Elizabeth Mason Campbell (1819–1907)
- Matilda Eulalia Mason Rhett (February 1821 – 22 February 1871)
- Thomson Francis Mason (January 1825 – 9 September 1841)
- John Francis Mason (28 August 1828 – 4 August 1897)
- Virginia Mason Davidge (1 February 1830 – December 1919)
- Caroline Betty Mason (9 March 1832 – 1919)
- Arthur Pendleton Mason (11 December 1835 – 22 April 1893)
- Clapham Mason (c. 1838 – November 16, 1844)

Thomson and Betsey's surviving five daughters and three sons attended various schools in Alexandria, where they learned music, drawing, and French in addition to reading and writing. The couple were friends with members of the Lee family, the Washingtons, the Madisons, and other landed gentry. Thomson and Betsey entertained lavishly at their Colross and Huntley estates.

Thomson Francis Mason was a grandson of George Mason (1725–1792); nephew of George Mason V (1753–1796); grandnephew of Thomson Mason (1733–1785); son of Thomson Mason (1759–1820) and Sarah McCarty Chichester Mason; first cousin once removed of Stevens Thomson Mason (1760–1803) and John Thomson Mason (1765–1824); second cousin of Armistead Thomson Mason (1787–1819), John Thomson Mason (1787–1850), and John Thomson Mason, Jr. (1815–1873); first cousin of George Mason VI (1786–1834), Richard Barnes Mason (1797–1850), and James Murray Mason (1798–1871); second cousin once removed of Stevens Thomson Mason (1811–1843); and first cousin thrice removed of Charles O'Conor Goolrick.

Ancestors of Thomson Francis Mason

16. George Mason II
8. George Mason III
17. Mary Fowke
4. George Mason IV
18. Stevens Thomson
9. Ann Stevens Thomson
19. Dorothea Taunton
2. Thomson Mason
20. William Eilbeck
10. William Eilbeck
21. Margaret Dixon
5. Ann Eilbeck
22. John Edgar
11. Sarah Edgar
23. Johanna
1. Thomson Francis Mason
24. John Chichester
12. Richard Chichester
25. Elizabeth Symes
6. Richard Chichester
26. William Ball III
13. Ellen Ball
27. Hannah Heale
3. Sarah McCarty Chichester
28. Dennis McCarty
14. Daniel McCarty
29. Sarah Ball
7. Sarah McCarty
30. James Ball
15. Sinah Ball
31. Mary Conway
