= Huntley (plantation) =

Historic house in Virginia, United States

- U.S. National Register of Historic Places
- Virginia Landmarks Register
- Fairfax County Inventory of Historic Sites
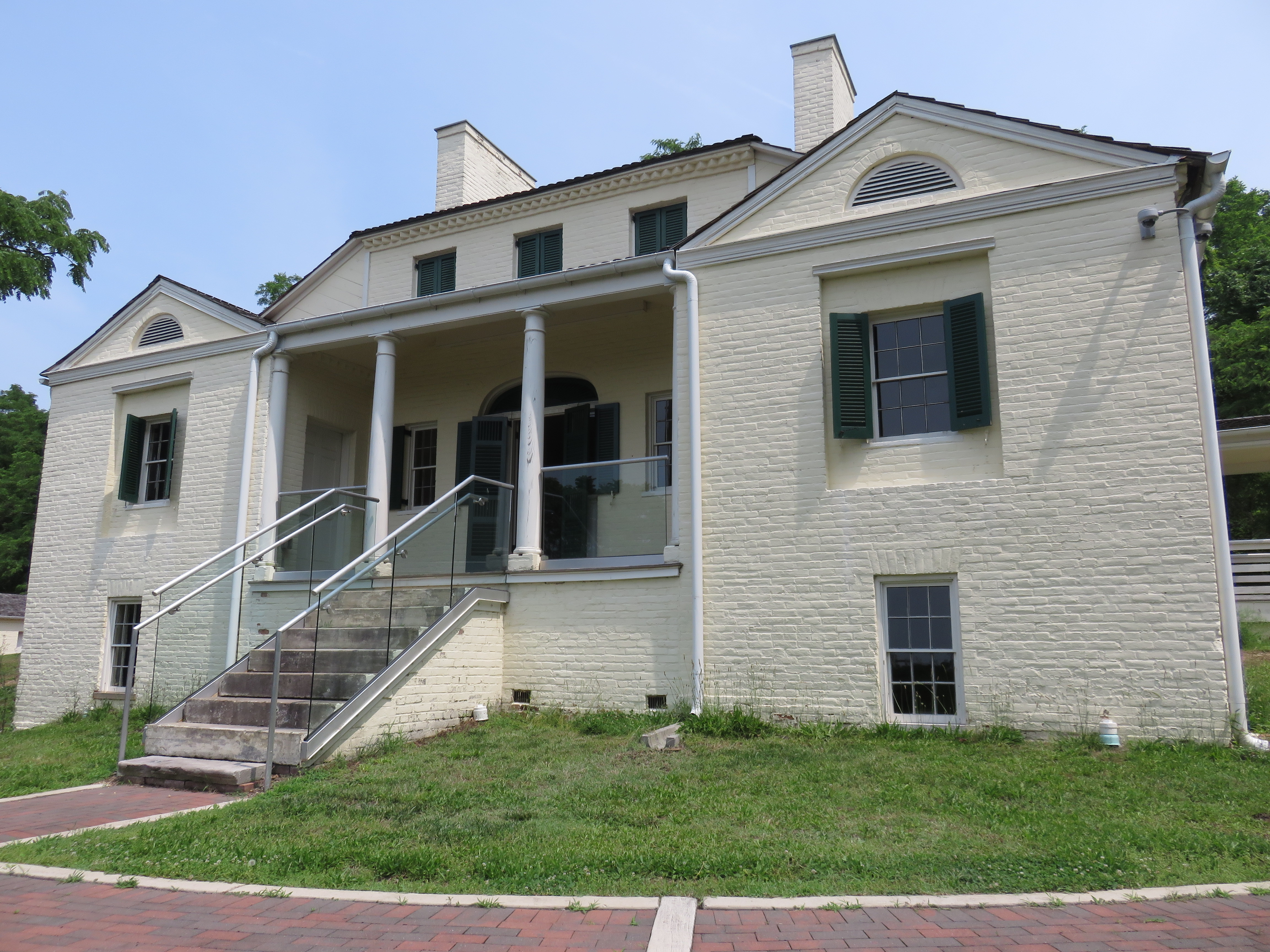
- Southern face of the house from the terraced lawn in 2019

- Location within Northern Virginia Location within Virginia Location within the United States
- Interactive map showing the location of Huntley
- Location: 6918 Harrison Lane Alexandria, Virginia
- Coordinates: 38°45′56″N 77°05′41″W
- Area: 16 acres (6.5 ha)
- Built: 1820–1825
- Architectural style: Federal; Greek Revival
- NRHP reference No.: 72001392
- VLR No.: 029-0117

Significant dates
- Added to NRHP: November 3, 1972
- Designated VLR: March 21, 1972
- Designated FCIHS: September 12, 1972

Huntley, also known as Historic Huntley or Huntley Hall, is an early 19th-century Federal-style villa and farm in the Hybla Valley area of Fairfax County, Virginia. The house sits on a hill overlooking Huntley Meadows Park to the south. The estate is best known as the country residence of Thomson Francis Mason (1785–21 December 1838), grandson of George Mason of nearby Gunston Hall. It is listed on the National Register of Historic Places (NRHP), the Virginia Landmarks Register (VLR), and the Fairfax County Inventory of Historic Sites.

== History ==
Upon the death of Mason's grandfather George Mason on 7 October 1792, his father Thomson inherited a portion of the Gunston Hall estate. Around 1817, Mason's father Thomson divided the property into two farms: Dogue Run farm for Mason's younger brother Richard Chichester Mason (1793–1869) and Hunting Creek farm adjacent to Mount Vernon for Mason.

After Mason's marriage in 1817 to Elizabeth "Betsey" Clapham Price of Leesburg, Virginia, he began building Huntley as a secondary home against a hillside overlooking Hybla Valley and the Potomac River on his Hunting Creek tract between 1820 and 1825. Consistent with its counterpart Mason residences like Gunston Hall and Hollin Hall, Huntley was most likely named for Huntly Castle, an ancestral home in Scotland from Mason's mother's side. Huntley never served as a permanent residence for Mason, who owned a number of houses in Alexandria including Colross, his chief homestead. Huntley was conveniently located along a gravel road from Alexandria. By 1834, Mason's brother Richard built Okeley Manor on neighboring Dogue Run farm.

Twenty years after Mason's death, his widow Betsey attempted to sell Huntley and its accompanying Hunting Creek farm in 1859. When she was unable to sell the property, Betsey transferred ownership on 7 November 1859 to her sons John "Frank" Francis Mason and Arthur "Pen" Pendleton Mason. Once the property was transferred to Mason's sons, Huntley was held as security on a debt to a family friend, Dr. Benjamin King. On 7 December, they obtained a $13,000 loan, due for repayment on 1 January 1862, from Dr. King. Frank Mason rented Huntley to George W. Johnson, a Union sympathizer, for two years beginning on 1 August 1860. Under their agreement with Johnson, the Masons promised him $1,000 to put the farm in order. At the onset of the war, Pen Mason enlisted in the Confederate States Army.

During the American Civil War from December 1861 through February 1862, the 3rd Michigan Volunteer Infantry Regiment camped at Huntley, with their quartermaster and his wife residing in the mansion. Also during the war, the Masons defaulted on their loan, and Dr. King eventually acquired Huntley at a public auction on 12 June 1862. Despite Dr. King's ownership, Johnson continued to reside at Huntley and worked the farm until February 1863. After the American Civil War, Johnson reported to the Southern Claims Commission that when Frank Mason and his mother Betsey traveled south before the war, the Masons left all of their servants and their servants' children in Johnson's care without compensation.

Six years after Dr. King purchased the estate, Albert W. Harrison and Nathan W. Pierson from New Jersey assumed Huntley's title on 21 November 1868 and divided their claim in 1871. Harrison took ownership of the mansion and its supporting structures and Pierson acquired the rest. Following Harrison's death in 1911, Huntley came into the possession of his heirs. Richard Chichester Mason's descendants sold nearby Okeley Manor in 1916, ending Mason family ownership of any of the original Gunston Hall property.

During the 1930s, Huntley's property, along with other former Mason properties, was partially reassembled by entrepreneur Henry Woodhouse for the proposed George Washington Air Junction. The airport was intended to serve as a regional landing site for Graf Zeppelin airships, but the plans never came to fruition and Woodhouse lost the land by default. The last of the Harrisons died in 1946 and Huntley's mansion was sold to August W. and Eleanor S. Nagel. During the Nagels' brief period of ownership, the couple commissioned Arlington architect Edward M. Pitt to make drawings of the mansion. Three years later, Huntley was sold to Colonel and Mrs. Ransom G. Amlong.

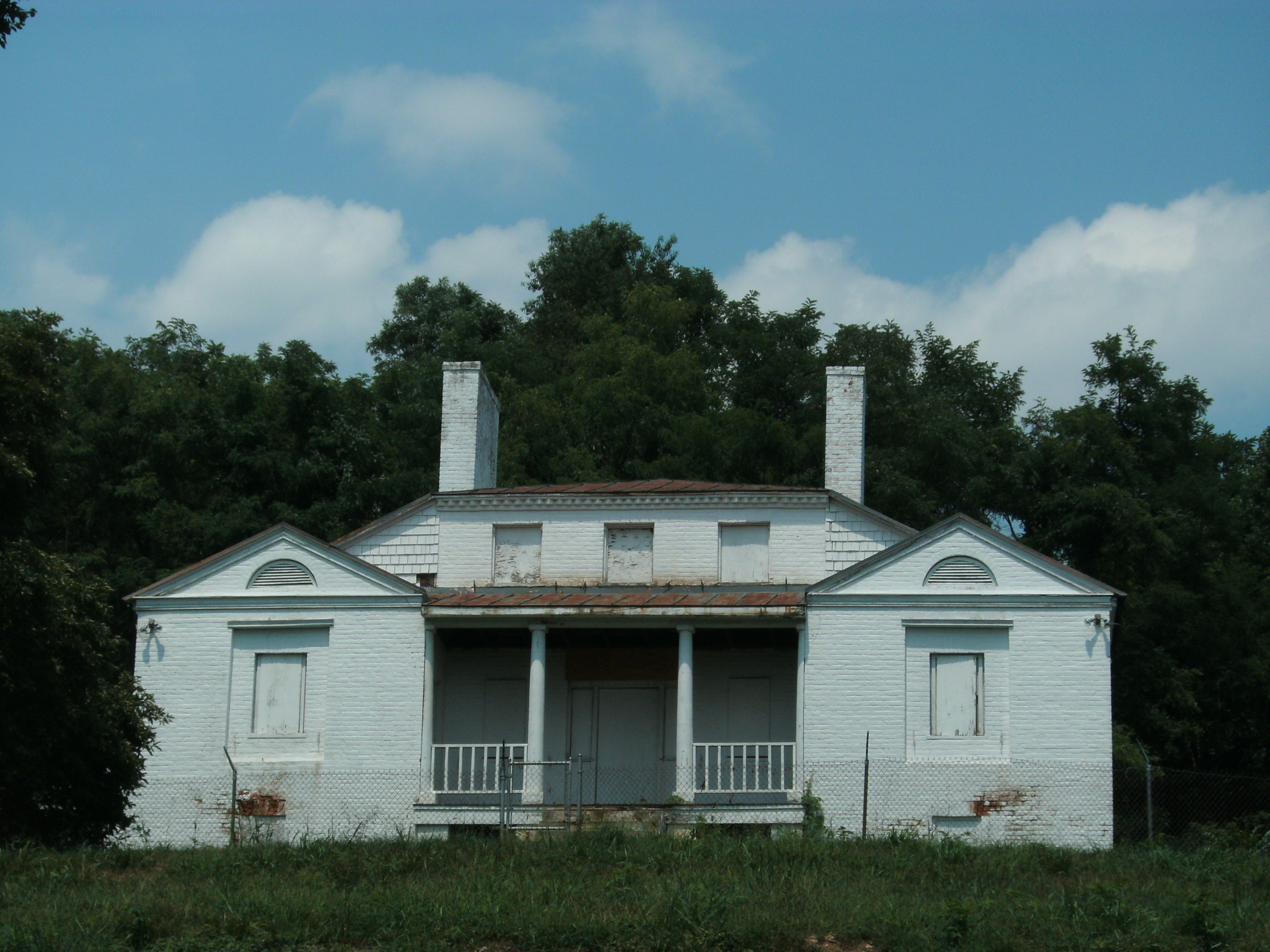
Huntley in 2009 after being boarded up and fenced off to protect the structure from further vandalism

Huntley was listed on the National Register of Historic Places on 3 November 1972. In 1989, Huntley was acquired by the Fairfax County Park Authority. Due to vandalism, it was boarded and fenced until restoration funds were secured. In May 2010 a contract was made for restoration and the work begun that fall. The exterior of the house was restored to its appearance in the early 19th century. A $100,000 grant through the National Park Service's Save America's Treasures program was awarded to help with the renovation. The Fairfax County Park Authority also provided several million dollars towards preservation and redevelopment of the site. The restored Huntley officially opened on May 19, 2012.

== Architecture ==
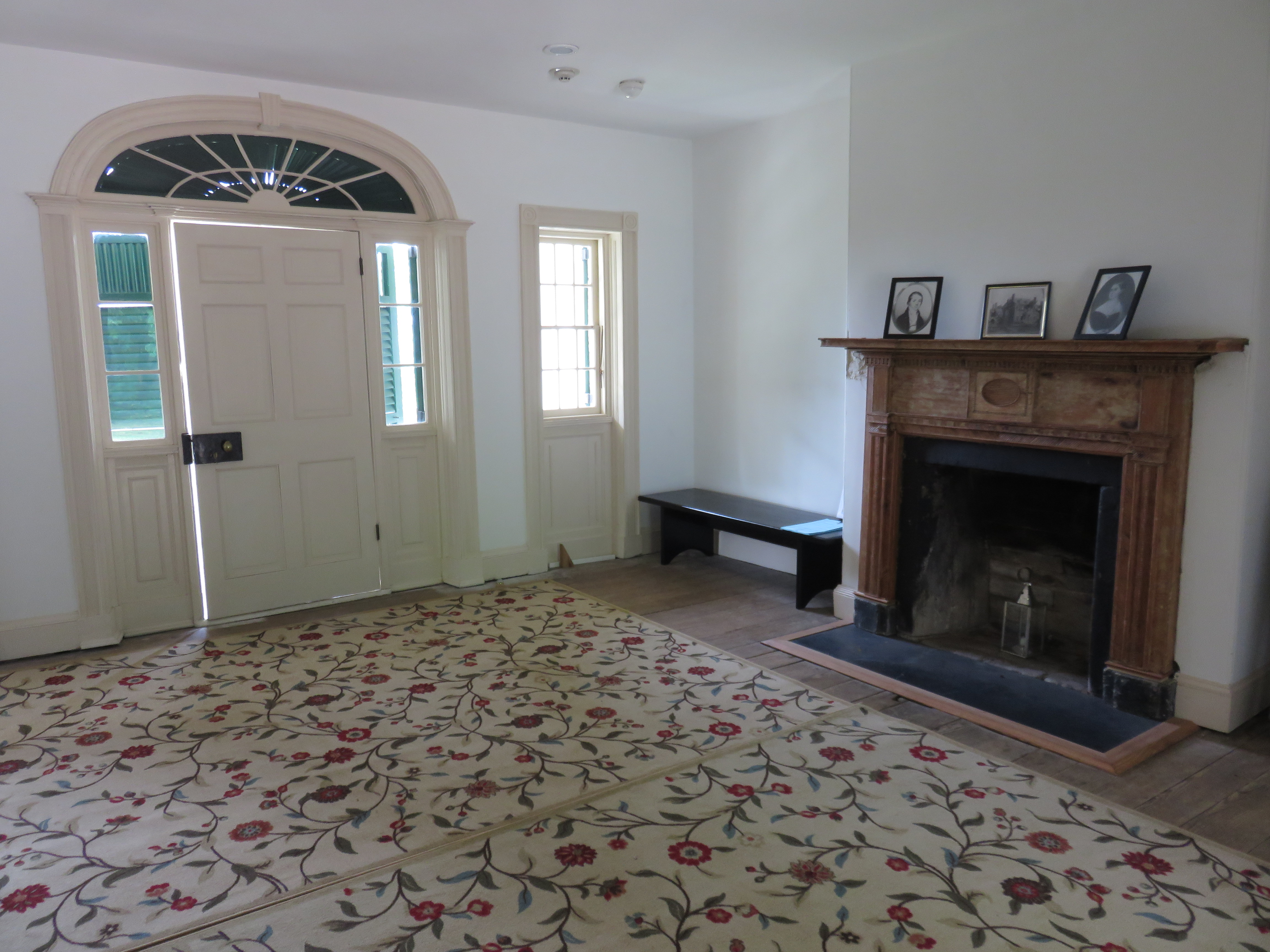
Interior

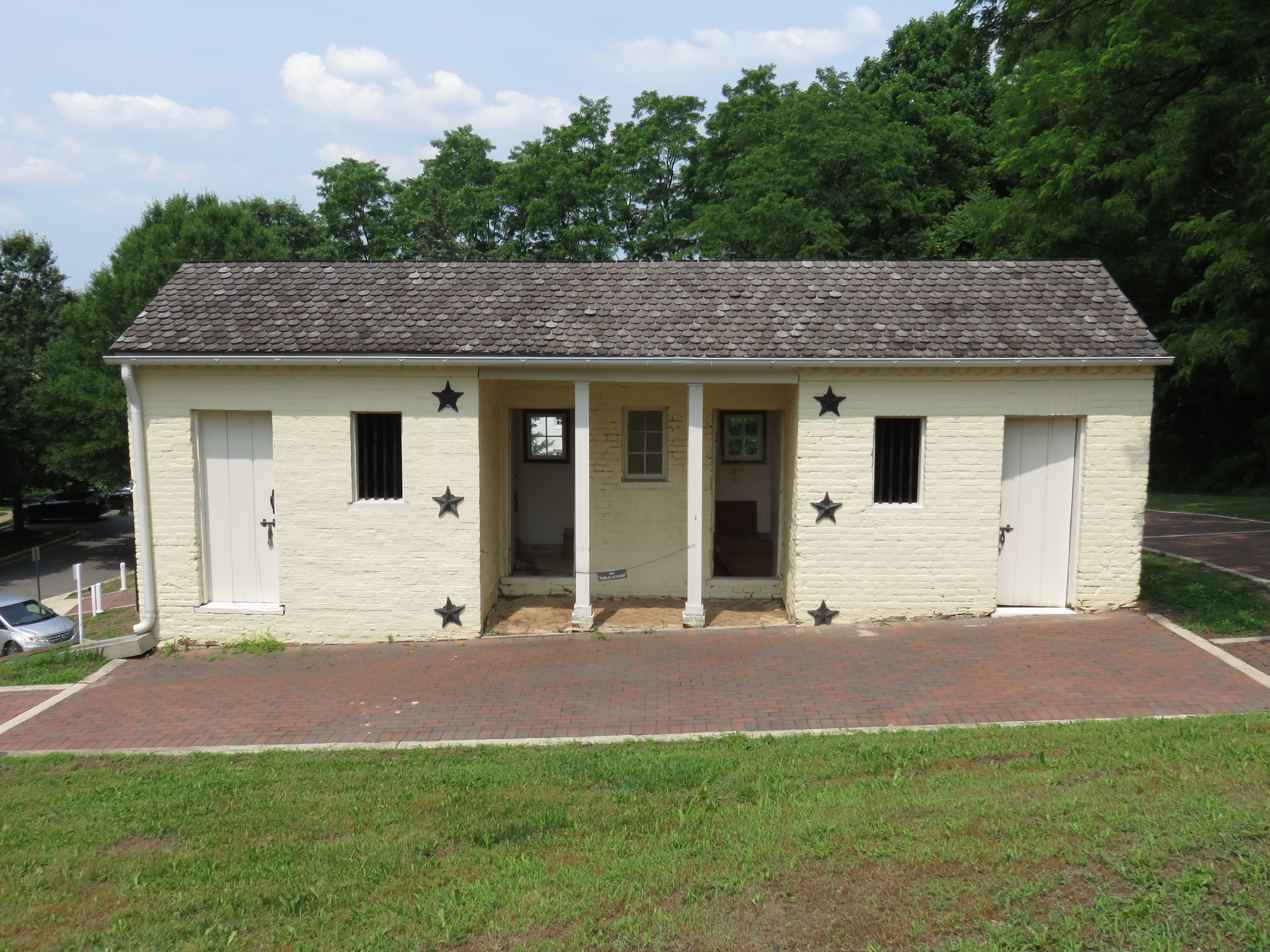
One of several outbuildings

Huntley's mansion and its surrounding farm complex were constructed between 1820 and 1825 in the early Federal style. Originally built in the shape of an "H", the mansion's central section rises three stories on the south and two on the north. For unknown reasons the east and west sides were built first and later joined in the center. Its brickwork is laid in a common bond. The mansion's flanking wings, which are one story lower than the one-room central section, each consist of two rooms. The central gable is crowned by two rectangular interior chimneys which run parallel to the mansion's roofline. The central gable also contains three bays with casements of nine panes each.

The second story of the central section is crowned by a mousetooth brick cornice that once marked the edge of the mansion's clipped roof. The first floor central section is sheltered by a three-bay porch addition that links the pedimented wings. The mansion's front entrance is framed by three-paned sidelights separated by slender reeded pilasters and surmounted by a fanlight with wooden tracery. The two bays which flank this entrance on the first floor porch have a four-over-four sash. The remaining windows on the ground and first floors consist of a six-over-six double hung sash. Set slightly into the brick of the house, the windows still consist mostly of their early glass, and single panel shutters vented by fixed louvers.

The mansion's most notable architectural features are its one-bay pedimented wings. The wing elevation on the south includes a simple ground floor bay surmounted by the first floor windows which are set into recessed rectangular frames. The side wings are topped by pediments enhanced by a molded cornice and enclosing louvered lunettes. Windows on the east and west sides of the mansion's wings are spaced irregularly. On the east side, two bays light the ground level and three bays break the wall of the first story.
