= Arthur Pendleton Mason =

American lawyer, planter, merchant and military officer

- Born: December 11, 1835; Fairfax County, Virginia
- Died: April 22, 1893 (aged 57); Morris Park, The Bronx, New York
- Burial place: Green Mount Cemetery, Baltimore, Maryland
- Military career
- Allegiance: Confederate States of America
- Branch: Confederate States Army
- Service years: 1861–1865 (Confederate States Army)
- Rank: Lieutenant colonel (CSA)
- Nickname: "Pen"
- Commands: 2nd Regiment Mississippi Cavalry; 6th Regiment Arkansas Volunteers; Army of Tennessee
- Conflicts: American Civil War
- Other work: merchant, businessperson

Arthur "Pen" Pendleton Mason (11 December 1835–22 April 1893) was an American military officer, merchant, planter and lawyer who served as a lieutenant colonel in the Confederate States Army serving during the American Civil War. Mason was a scion of the prominent Mason political family of Virginia.

== Early life and education ==
Mason was born on 11 December 1835 near Alexandria, Virginia in Fairfax County. He was the ninth and youngest child of Thomson Francis Mason (1785–21 December 1838) and his wife Elizabeth "Betsey" Clapham Price (1802–21 December 1873).

Mason earned his law degree from the University of Virginia. Following law school, Mason was a planter and practiced law in Alexandria and Richmond.

Mason's father died on 21 December 1838 in Alexandria at the age of 53. Mason inherited his father's Colross estate in Alexandria. His mother transferred ownership of Huntley on 7 November 1859 to Mason and his brother Dr. John "Frank" Francis Mason.

== American Civil War ==
During the American Civil War, Mason joined the 2nd Regiment Mississippi Cavalry in either late 1860 or early 1861. On 5 June 1861, Mason transferred to the 6th Regiment of Brigadier General Thomas C. Hindman's brigade of Arkansas Volunteers. On 11 December 1861, Mason was ordered to report to General Joseph E. Johnston at Manassas. His brother-in-law, Thomas Grimke Rhett, was Johnston's chief of staff at the time. Mason was Johnston's assistant adjutant general during most of the war. Mason served as a member of Johnston's staff until Johnston was wounded at the Battle of Seven Pines in 1862. Mason then served under Robert E. Lee until 1863 when he rejoined Johnston's during the Vicksburg Campaign. Following Johnston's removal from the command of the Army of Tennessee during the Atlanta campaign, Mason joined the staff of John Bell Hood. Mason was appointed colonel in the 2nd Mississippi Cavalry on 2 January 1864, but President Jefferson Davis declined to nominate him and his appointment was later voided. Upon Hood's defeat at Nashville in December 1864, Mason joined Lieutenant General Richard Taylor's staff before rejoining Johnston in North Carolina at the end of the war.

== Marriage and children ==
Mason married Mary Ellen Campbell, daughter of Associate Justice of the Supreme Court of the United States, John Archibald Campbell. The couple had four children, with only one surviving to adulthood:

- John Archibald Campbell Mason (10 December 1870–18 April 1888)

== Later life ==
Following the war, Mason relocated to New Orleans, Louisiana where he became a merchant. He was President of The Boston Club

Mason died on 22 April 1893 in Morris Park, The Bronx, New York at age 57. Mason was interred in Green Mount Cemetery in Baltimore, Maryland.
