= Cornell West Campus =

Residential section of Cornell University

Coordinates: 42°26′50″N 76°29′22″W

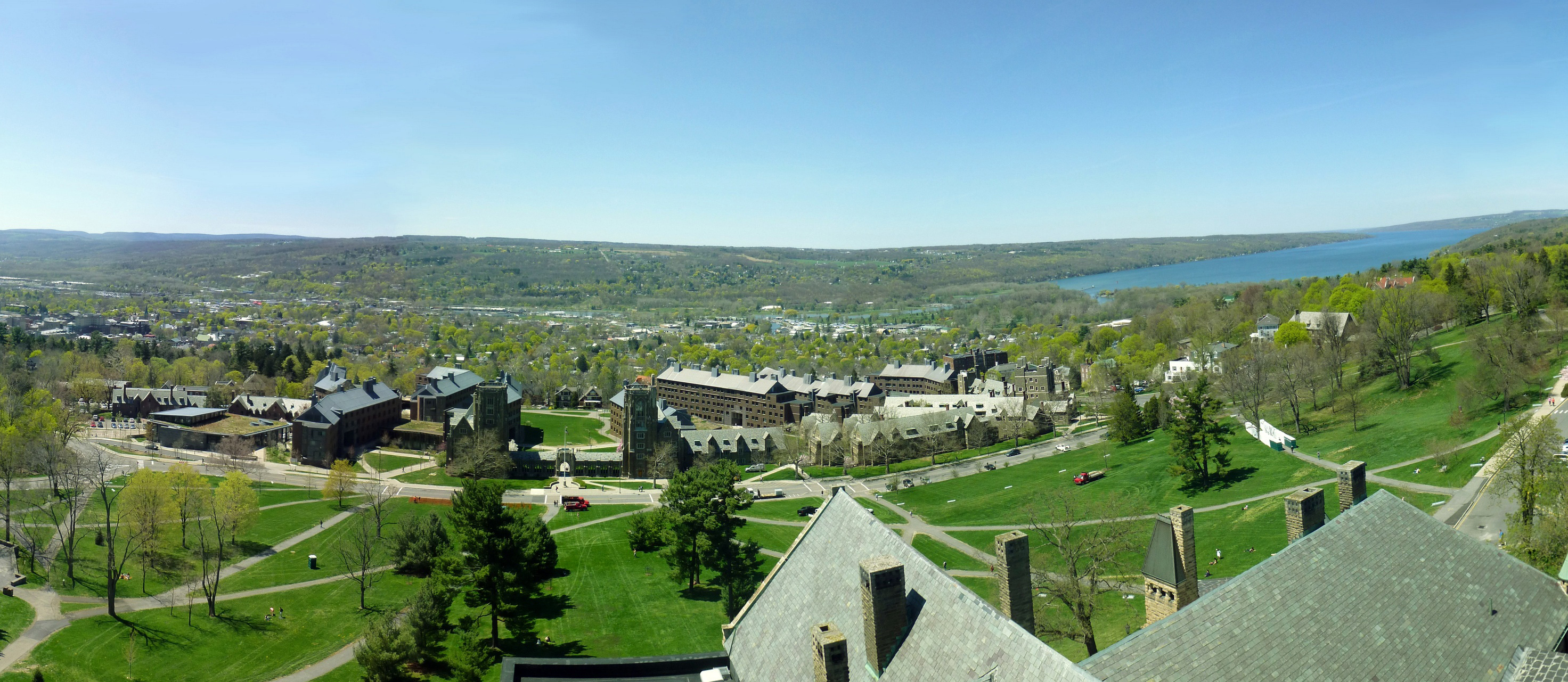
Cornell West Campus as seen from McGraw Tower in May 2013

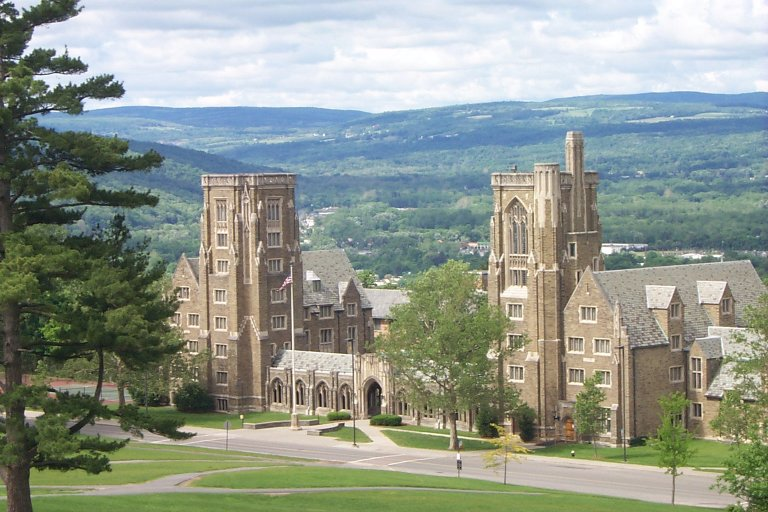
The War Memorial seen from a distance

West Campus is a residential section of Cornell University main campus in Ithaca, New York. It is bounded roughly by Fall Creek gorge to the north, West Avenue and Libe Slope to the east, Cascadilla gorge and the Ithaca City Cemetery to the south, and University Avenue and Lake Street to the west. It now primarily houses transfer students, second year students, and upperclassmen.

The university's Division of Student and Campus Life (SCL) uses the term differently, to refer to those buildings which are part of the West Campus House System, which organizes residents into five residential colleges. SCL labels its traditional dormitories and other residences on West Campus and in Collegetown collectively as "South Campus."

== History ==
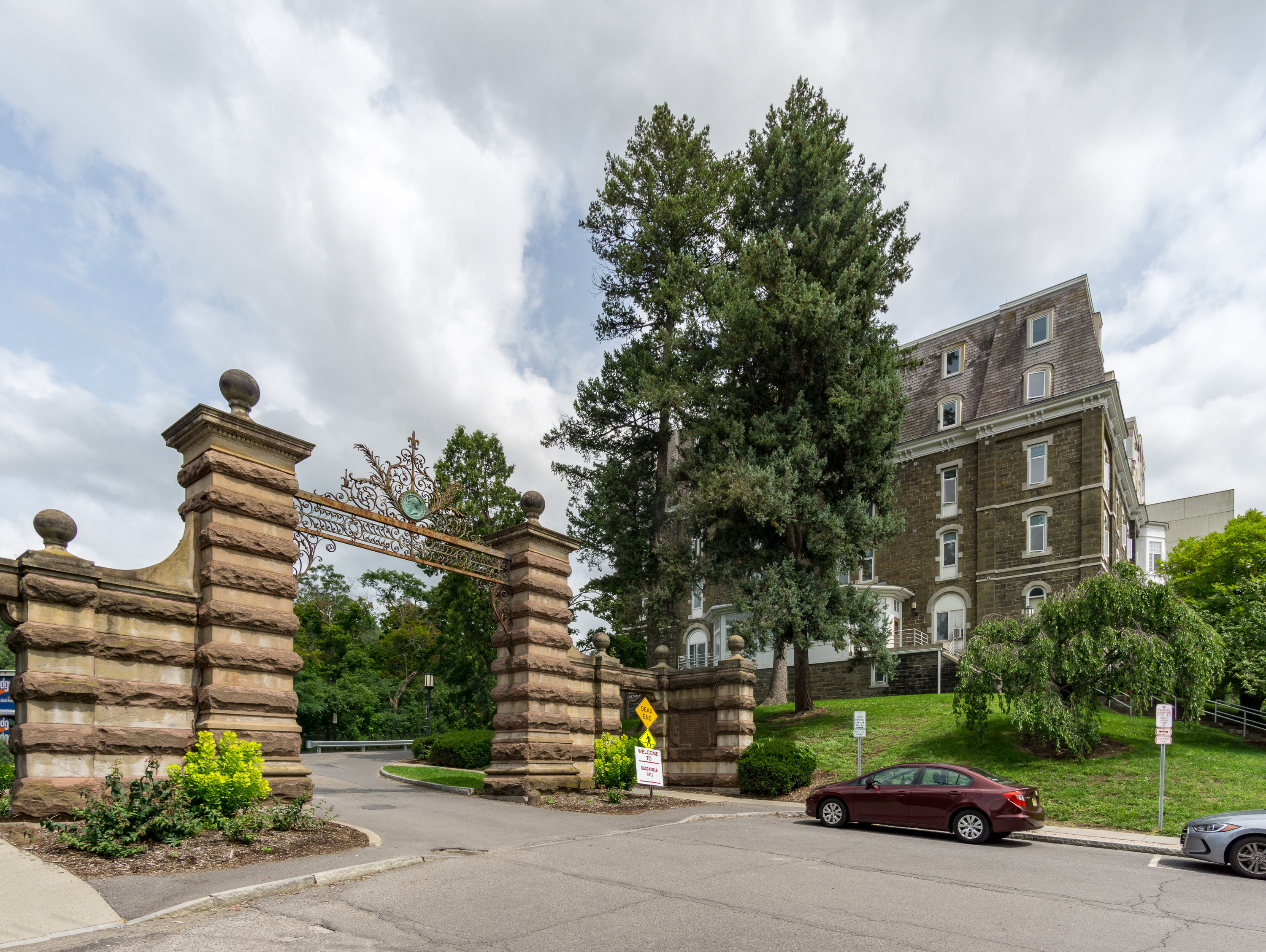
Cascadilla Hall

Cornell's first president, Andrew Dickson White, was broadly opposed to student dormitories, believing that boarding houses and fraternities provided a superior living environment. Owing to the isolation of the campus, the university acquired Cascadilla Hall and housed some students and faculty there, and later in the "Stone Row" buildings on central campus, White, McGraw, and Morrill Halls. No dedicated residence halls would be erected for almost half a century.

=== Grand Terrace ===
The 1920s plans to expand the gothics

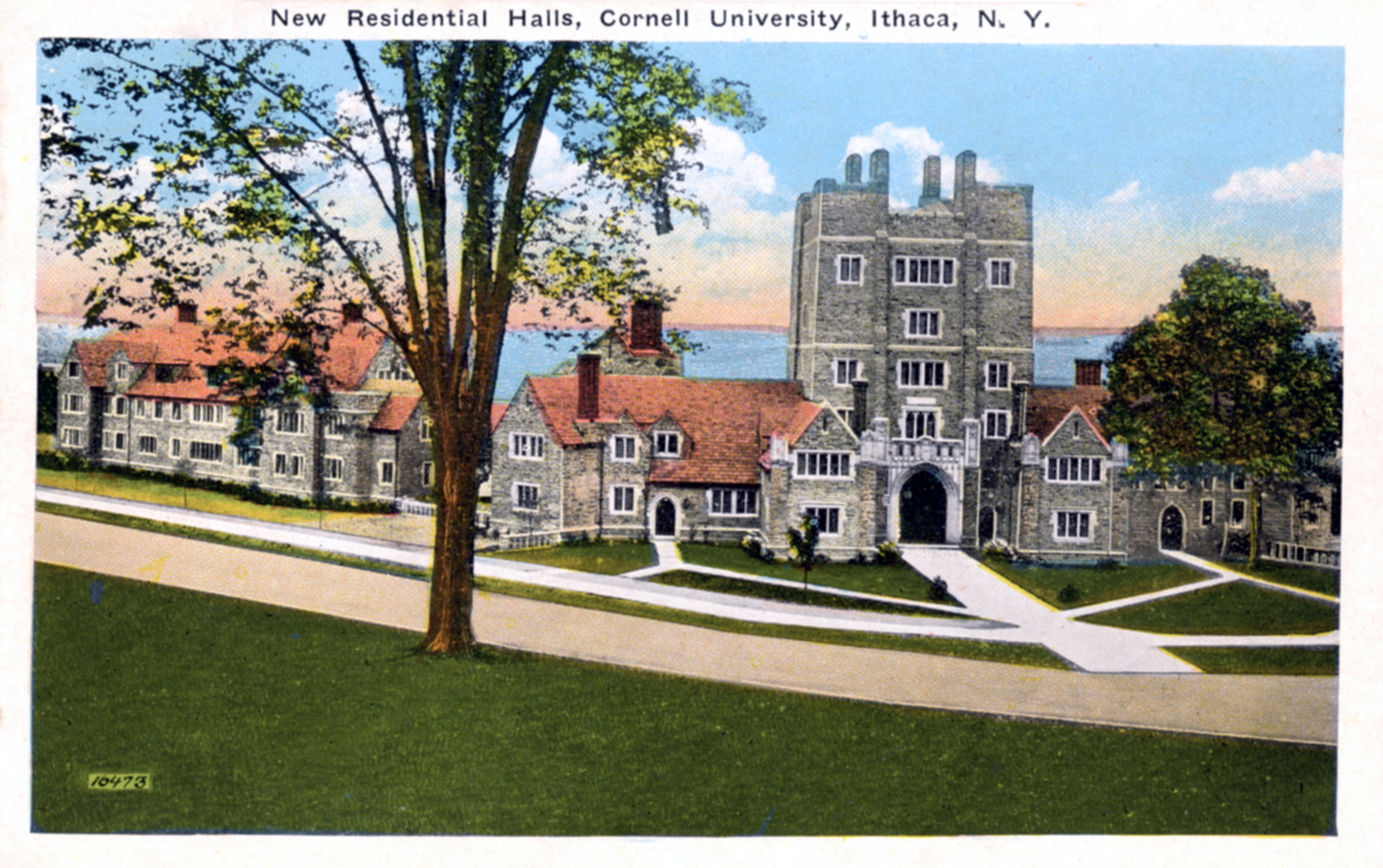
A postcard of Baker Tower

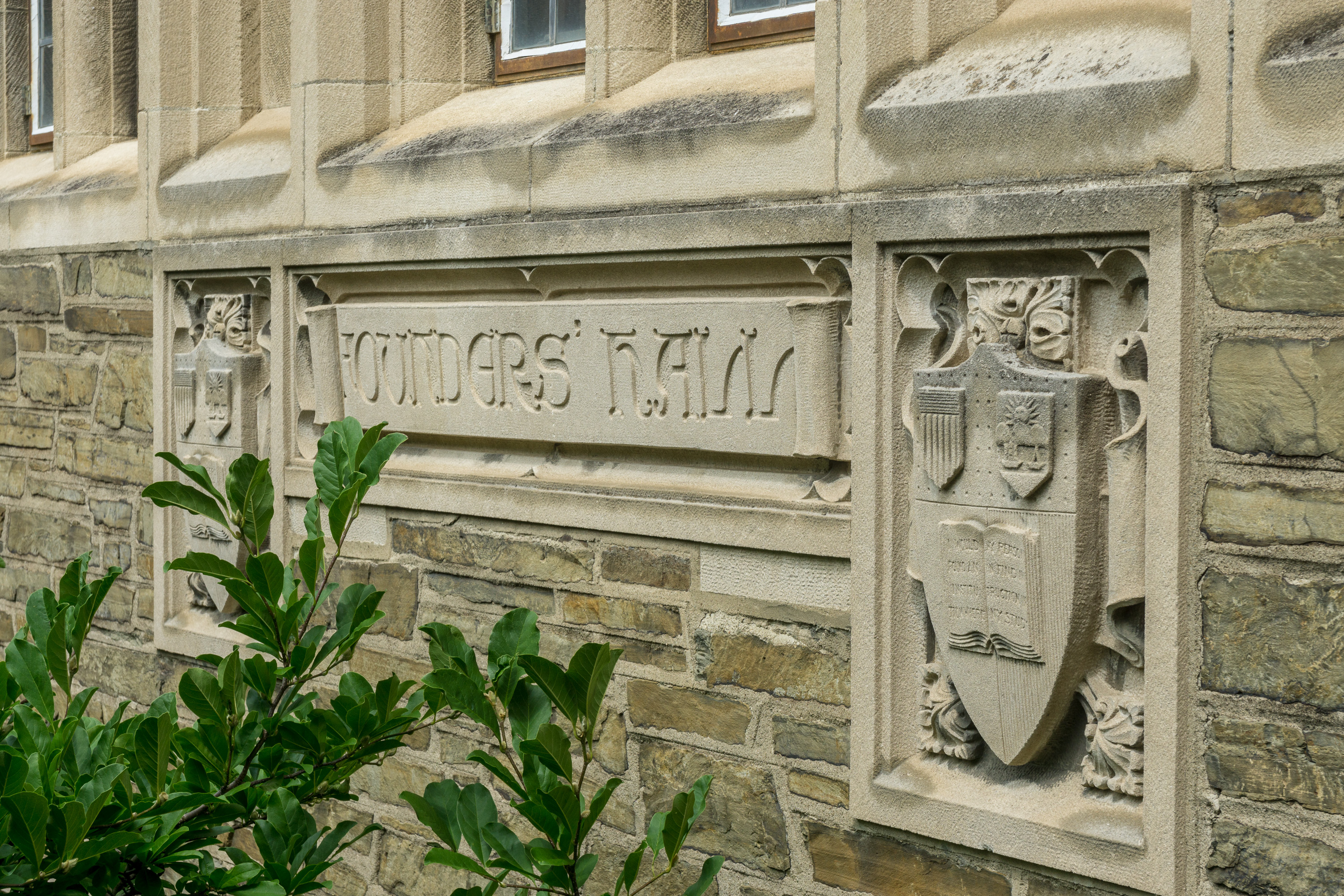
Detail of ornamentation on Founders Hall

After Prudence Risley Hall was designed as a women's residence in 1911, efforts began on a men's residential complex on West Campus. In 1910, Warren Hanning's campus plan had established the site for new buildings in the English Collegiate Gothic style. Trustees A.D. White, George Charles Boldt, and Robert H. Treman led a subscription campaign. The site was designed by architect Ralph Adams Cram, who had recently completed the Graduate School at Princeton University. Architectural firm Day & Klauder designed multiple buildings, each housing between 16 and 30 men. The first, Founders Hall, was completed in 1913.

In the 1920s, West Campus was envisioned as fully Gothic in style, connected to Frederick Law Olmsted's plan of a grand terrace overlooking Cayuga Lake. Rhode Island architect F. Ellis Jackson, of the class of 1900, expanded this plan to include a memorial to the 264 Cornellians who had died in World War I. The war memorial group, completed in 1928, features the towers of Lyon Hall to the north and McFaddin Hall to the south, and a memorial cloister connecting the two. The ninth and last of the "Gothic" structures, Mennen Hall, was built in 1931.

The grand terrace was never realized amidst the Great Depression and World War II, and the plans scrapped owing to the rapid postwar expansion in enrollment. Six modern brick-faced dormitories were built in 1953 to accommodate the postwar expansion. Numbered 1 to 6, these were designated the "University Halls" to distinguish them from the Gothic "Baker Dormitories." In the 1960s–1980s, five of the individual University Halls were named in honor of various alumni classes that had achieved large donation records. The original Noyes Community Center, which offered dining, recreation and other services to residents of the campus, was constructed in 1966.

The university also built or acquired a number of small residences in the area; it purchased the Central Avenue fraternity houses of Psi Upsilon and Sigma Phi fraternities to build Myron Taylor Hall (dedicated 1932), to be the home of the Cornell Law School, and built new houses for them on West Campus. These acquisitions accelerated after the war, with the university removing faculty housing and acquiring fraternities and other small living units around campus. Some, like 110 Edgemoor Lane, were demolished for parking or new construction, while others have been maintained as offices or residences.

Before funding was obtained for new residences on either North or West Campus, the university added housing in the Collegetown neighborhood south of campus. Sheldon Court and Sage Infirmary (now Schuyler House) were converted into dormitories in 1981. Cascadilla Hall, the oldest building on campus, was renovated 1983–84, including the addition of a fifth floor, which increased its capacity from 144 beds to approximately 390.

=== 1999 West Campus Initiative ===
Cornell had been considering establishing a series of residential colleges since a campus committee chaired by Alain Seznec recommended them in 1969. Although a residential college was established in Risley Hall in 1970, a lack of funding delayed more widespread implementation. In 1999, then-Cornell president Hunter R. Rawlings III announced a new West Campus Initiative to rebuild large parts of West Campus.

== Residences ==
=== House system ===
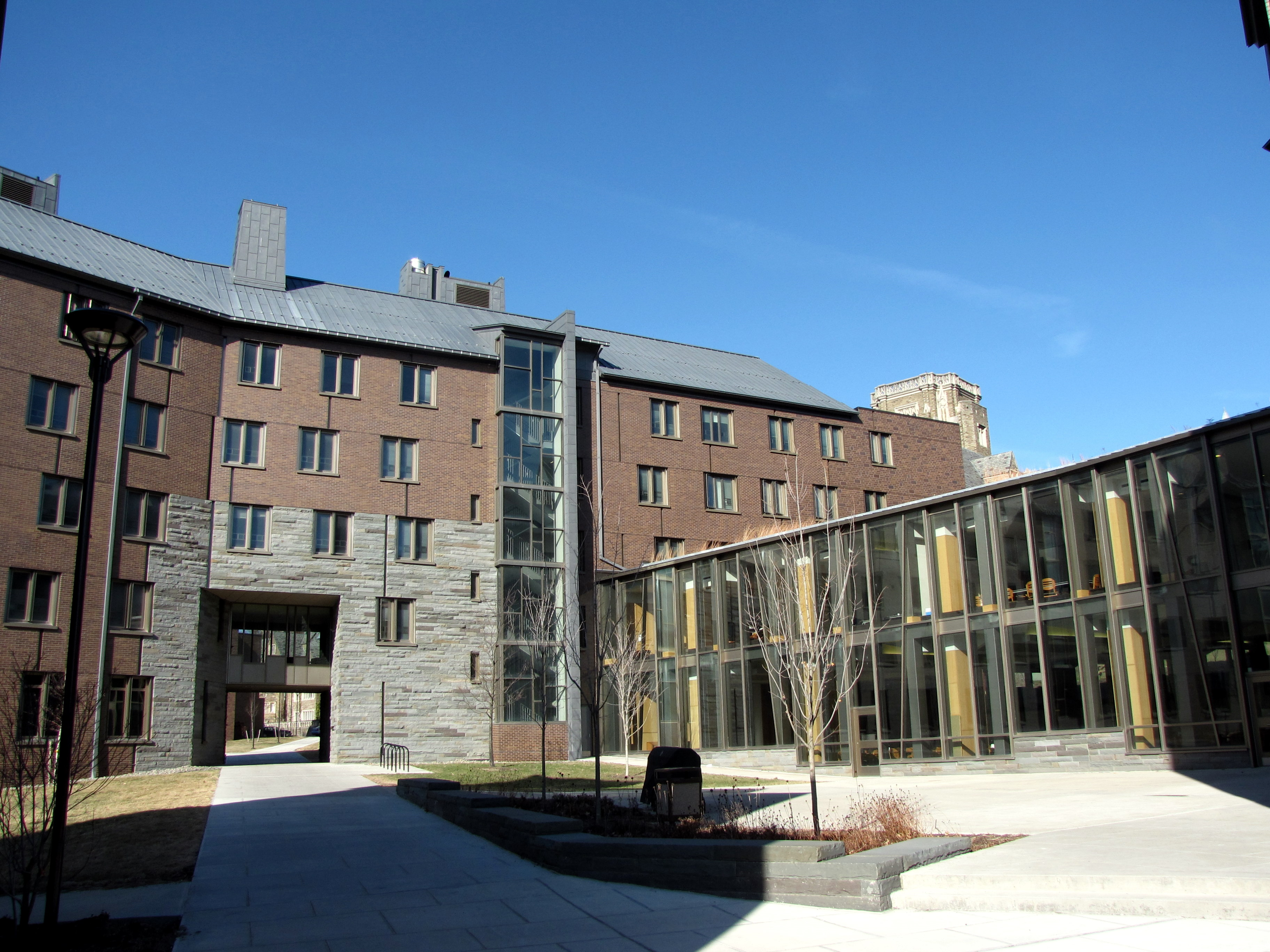
One of the dormitory wings of Hans Bethe House (left) connected to a communal area (right). The house dining hall is located on the first floor of the structure on the right with lounges, meeting rooms, and study space filling the second floor of the structure.

The West Campus House System, created as part of the Residential Initiative, organizes residents into five houses, each named after a noted Cornell professor:

- Alice Cook House (opened 2004), named in honor of School of Industrial and Labor Relations labor historian and University Ombudsman Alice H. Cook (1903–1998)
- Carl Becker House (opened 2005), named in honor of historian Carl L. Becker (1873–1945)
- Hans Bethe House (completed January 2007), named in honor physicist Hans Bethe (1906–2005)
- William T. Keeton House (completed August 2008), named in honor of biologist William T. Keeton (1933–1980)
- Flora Rose House (completed August 2008, opened August 2009) named after Flora Rose (1874–1959).

The residential college system was intended to create smaller learning communities, to which end each is headed by a House Professor-Dean, a tenured professor who directs the educational program, assisted by an Assistant Dean who is a student affairs professional. In addition to programming, the houses also sponsor various recreational and social activities.

Each house has a main building, which includes a dining hall, laundry, kitchen, and study facilities. Most residents are in single and double rooms along corridors, with shared bathrooms, with some in suites, accommodating up to five people.

=== Baker Dormitories ===
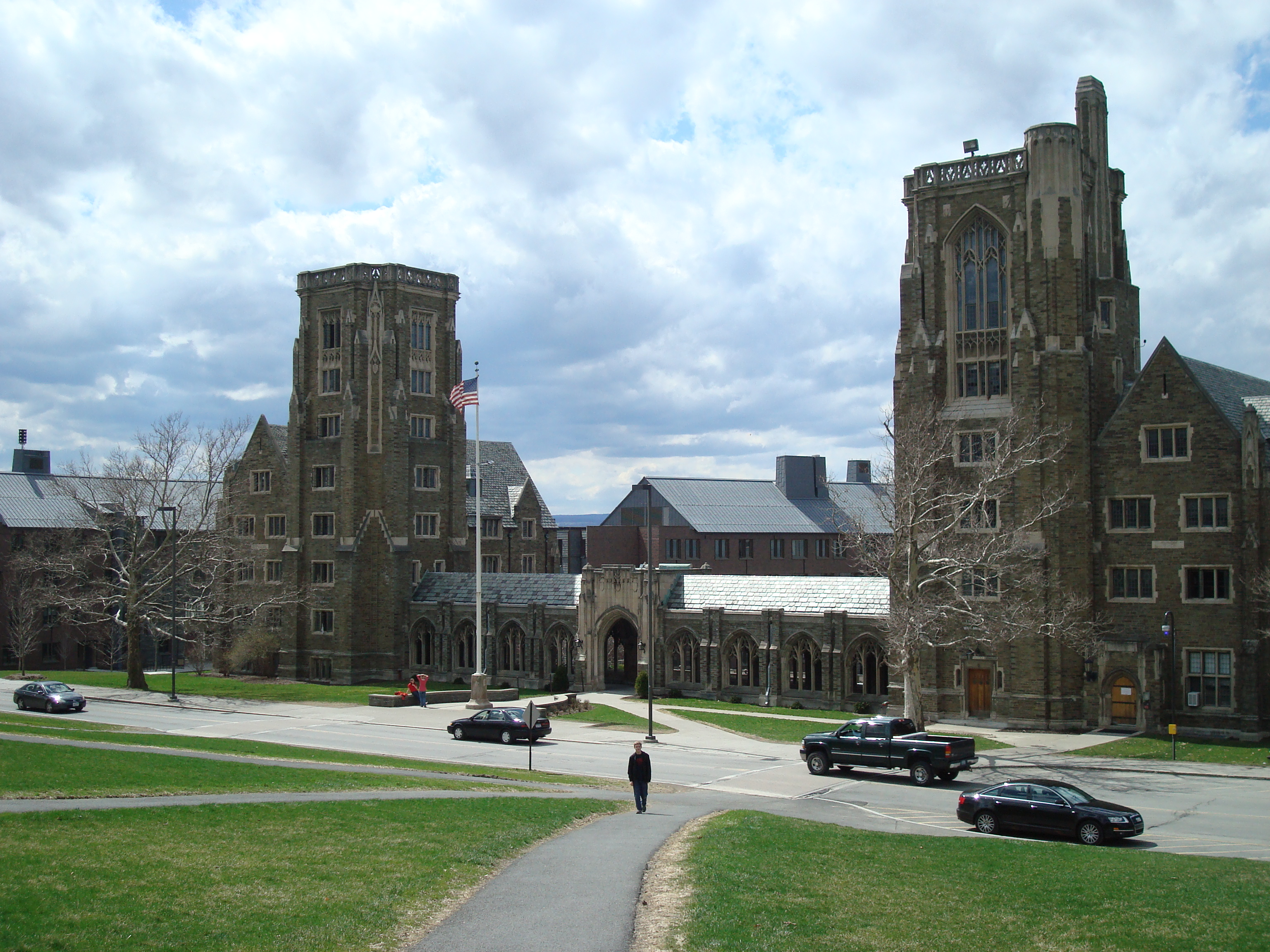
The War Memorial and Hans Bethe House (in background)

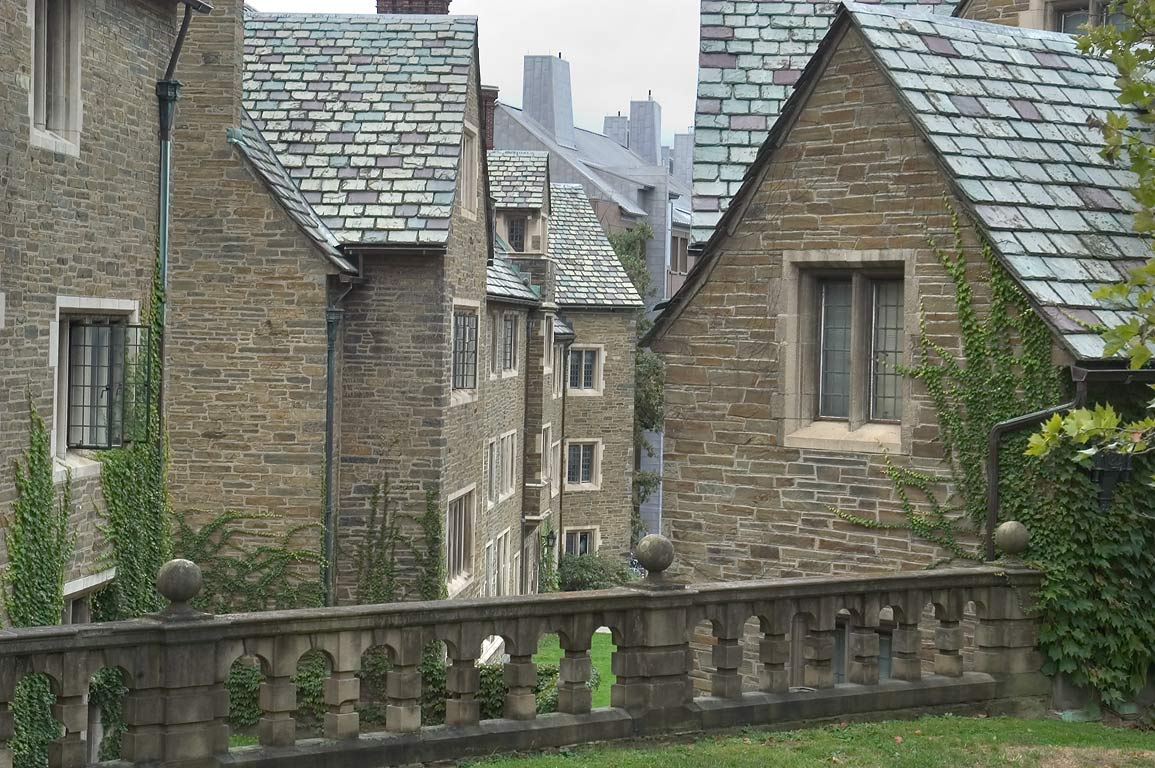
The Gothics

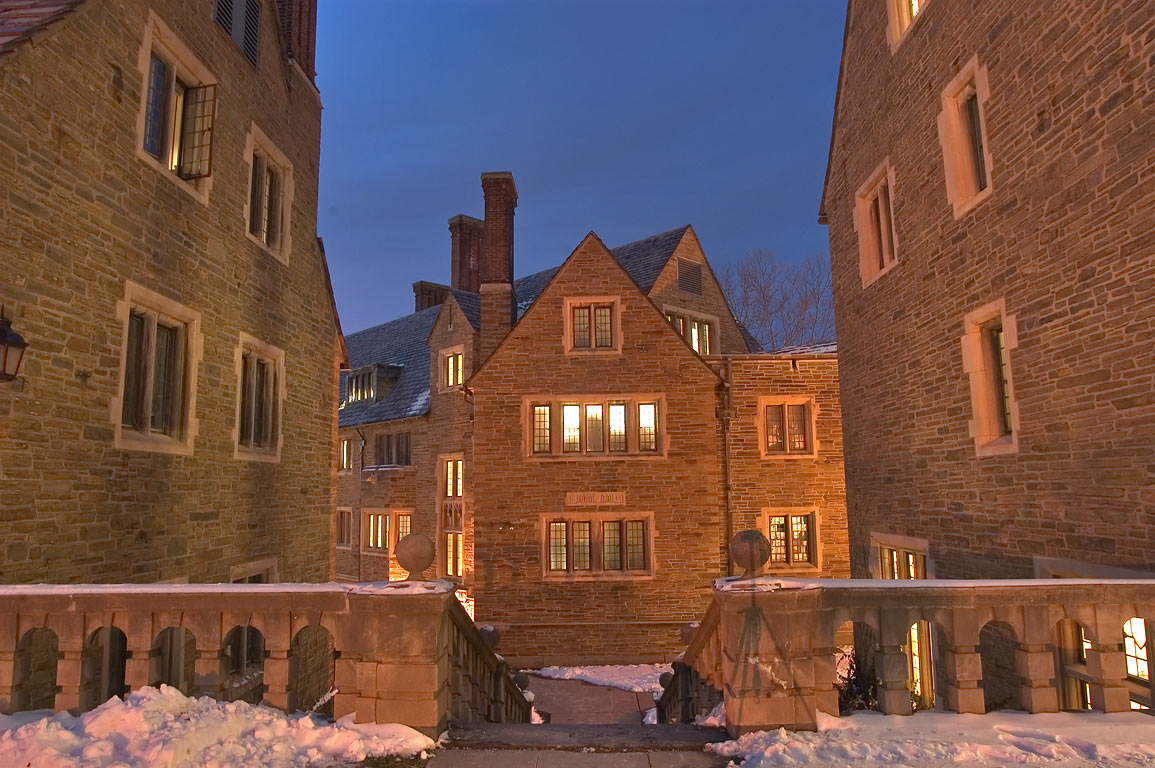
Boldt Hall

To the north and east of the houses lie the nine original West Campus residences, collectively known as the "Baker dormitories," after George Fisher Baker, the New York City banker who funded their construction, or as the "Gothic halls," reflecting their ivy-covered Collegiate Gothic architecture and construction of local bluestone trimmed in Indiana limestone. The firm of Day & Klauder (Charles Zeller Klauder after Day's death in 1918) designed all these buildings, which were built between 1913 and 1931.

They housed both freshmen and upper-level males through the 1970s, after which most became co-ed, and Lyon Hall was women-only. All were integrated into the house system after its creation.

- Baker Tower (completed 1913, part of Alice Cook House) - gift of the daughter of George Fisher Baker
- Boldt Hall (1921, Alice Cook House) - named for trustee George Boldt; houses the Language House, the only program house in the West Campus House System
- Boldt Tower (1928, Alice Cook House) - named for trustee George Boldt, founding manager and president of the old Waldorf Astoria Hotel in New York City; an inscribed red sandstone block from hotels is embedded in the south facade
- Founders Hall (1914, Flora Rose House)
- North Baker Hall (1915, Alice Cook House)
- South Baker Hall (1915, Flora Rose House)
- Lyon Hall (1928, Flora Rose) - connected to the Army Tower of the War Memorial, and housing a memorial shrine overseen by the Scabbard and Blade society
- McFaddin Hall (1928, Hans Bethe House) - named by donor Harrison D. McFaddin, Class of 1894, creator of the banker's lamp, in honor of his parents; connected to the Navy Tower of the War Memorial
- Mennen Hall (1931, Flora Rose House) - named for donor William Gerhard Mennen, Class of 1908 and built by the Crowell Little Construction Company of Cleveland, Ohio

All gothic buildings serve as an extension of the house to which they belong. Anyone living in a gothic may attend their respective house dinner, and anybody from a specific house community may swipe into other buildings associated with that house. For example, a South Baker Hall resident can swipe into Lyon, Mennen, Founders, or Rose-main at any time.

=== Class Halls ===
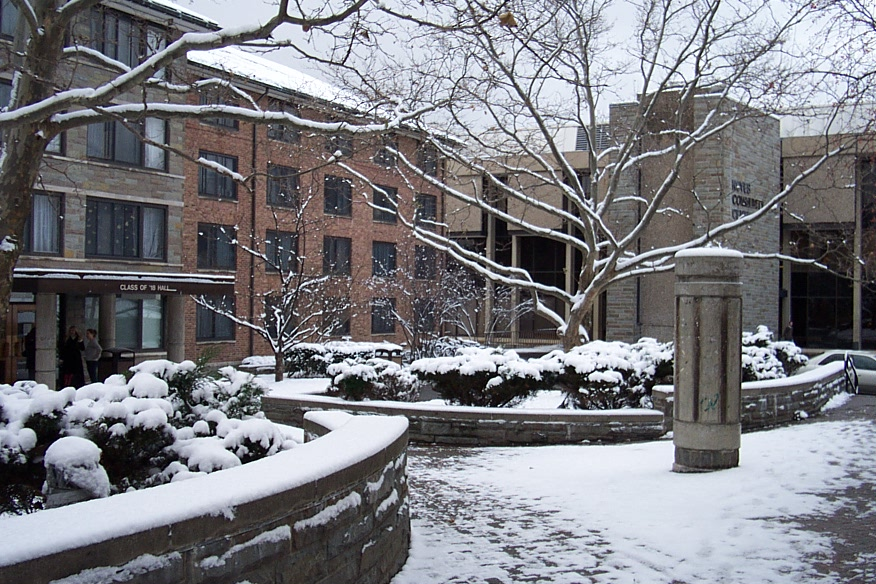
Class of '18 Hall

Known as the University Halls or "U-Halls," the Class Halls were originally all-male dormitories built on West Campus in 1953. They were designed by Chapman, Evans & Delehanty and Quinlivan, Pierik & Krause and constructed of utilitarian cinder block faced with brick. Although officially denied by Cornell, some claim that when constructed, they were intended to be temporary housing (as evidenced, for example, by the transitory fiberglass showers) until better structures could be built. A student union, Noyes Center, was built in the middle of the group in 1966.

In 1987, these buildings were gutted and the original aluminum-framed windows replaced with dark-brown metal casings. More study spaces and kitchens were added, and the capacity of each building was reduced. As part of the West Campus Residential Initiative, all building were slated for demolition as allowed by capacity from new construction on North Campus; all were demolished between 2003 and 2007 to make way for the new house buildings.

== Housing selection process ==
Cornell uses a lottery system to allocate on-campus housing, starting with rising sophomores, who are required to live in university-affiliated housing, then extended to rising juniors and seniors. For the 2024-25 academic year, however, rising juniors and seniors chose on-campus housing in September 2023 on a first come, first serve basis, while rising sophomores continued the housing selection process in March 2024, via the lottery.

== War memorial ==
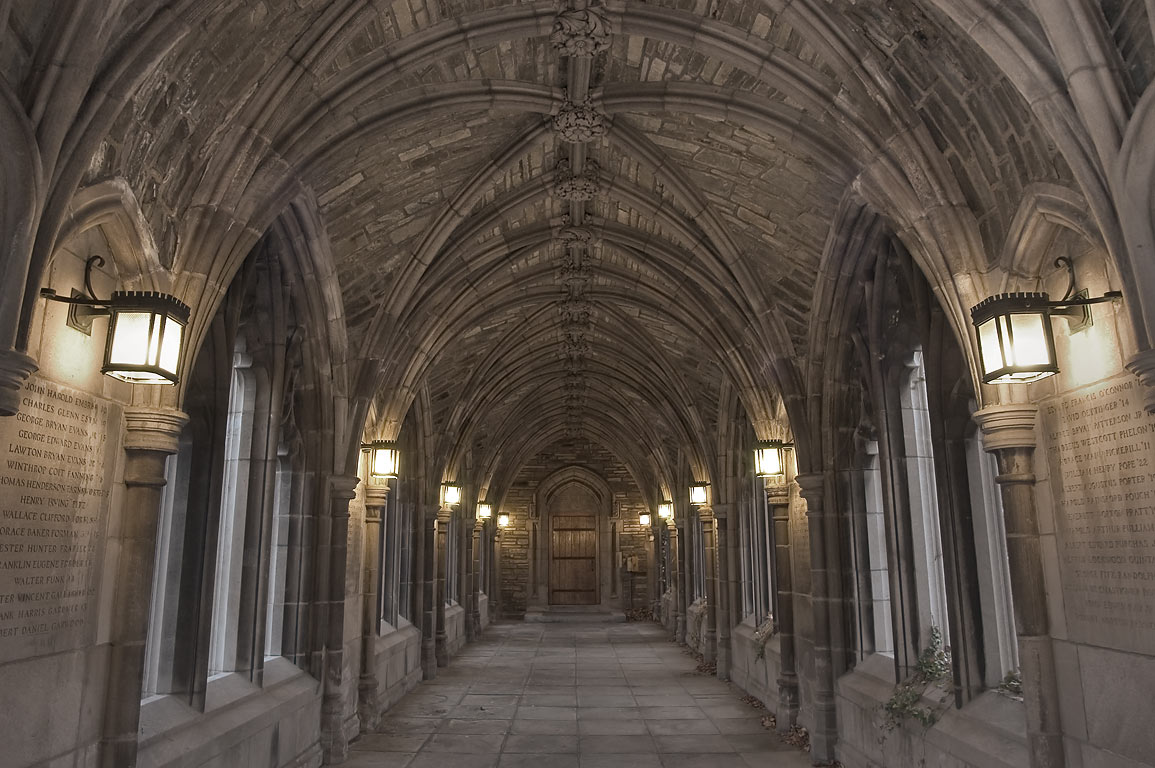
The War Memorial

The War Memorial, dedicated on May 23, 1931, included a radio address by President Herbert Hoover. It was the 14th anniversary of the first Americans, which included an American Ambulance Field Service unit led by Capt. Edward Tinkham (Class of 1916) and other Cornellians, arriving on the Western Front in World War I.

The complex includes two towers representing the army and the navy, Lyon Hall to the north and McFaddin Hall to the south. Between the two is a cloister featuring the names of 264 Cornellians who died in the war; Hans Wagner, Class of 1912, who died fighting for the German Empire, was excluded. Some students objected to the omission, and raised a fund to add his name; the university stationed a guard at the memorial to prevent his surreptitious addition. The president of the university, Livingston Farrand, denied the appeal, and in 1934 the funds were instead given to Kurt Lewin, acting professor of education and a refugee from the Third Reich.

The names are inscribed on 16 plaques set between unglazed tracery windows, over which are inscribed the names of the battles in which they fought. The names of individual and group donors toward the construction of the halls are inscribed in the tower rooms, Lyon Hall, and over the buildings' entries. The first floor of the War Memorial includes an elaborately decorated octagonal memorial room to the war dead, including a painting by Alison Mason Kingsbury. The upper two floors were designed as the meeting rooms and apartments for the Quill and Dagger senior society.

== Other buildings ==
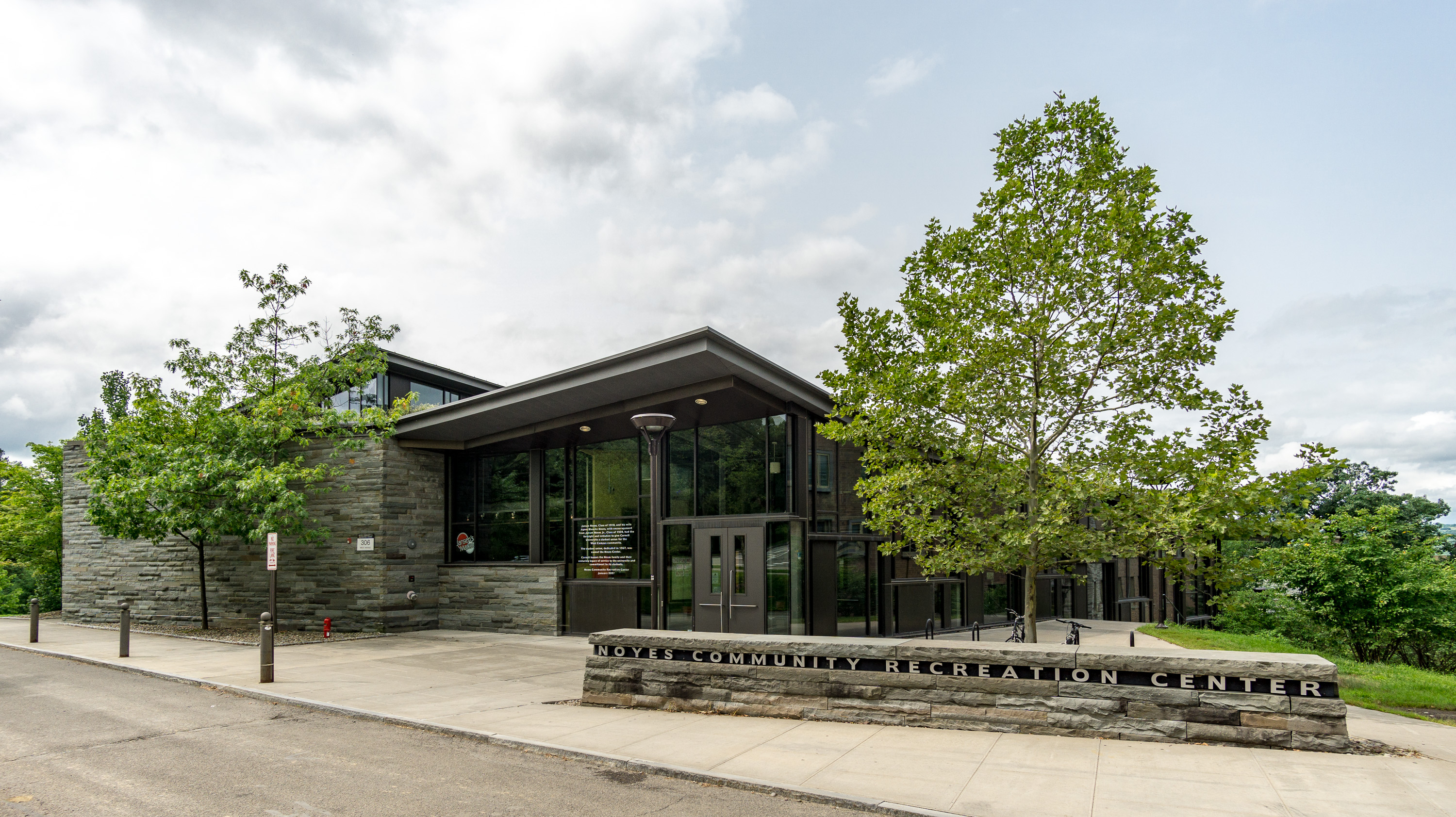
Noyes Community Recreation Center

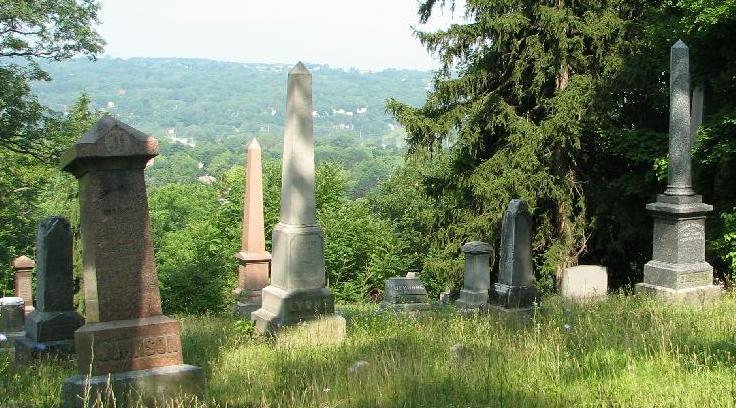
Ithaca City Cemetery

West Campus was served by the Noyes Community Center, formerly the Noyes Student Union, located on Stewart Avenue, centered on the axis of the War Memorial, until the 2006-07 academic year. This building was demolished and in 2007 was replaced with the Noyes Community Recreation Center, which provides indoor athletic facilities located on Campus Road.

Academic buildings include: the Treman House (1902) designed by William Henry Miller, which houses the George McT. Kahin Center for Advanced Research on Southeast Asia.
