= Alice Cook (professor) =

Alice Hanson Cook (November 28, 1903 – February 7, 1998) was an activist and professor of labor history at Cornell University in the United States. At Cornell, the Alice Cook House, a residence hall on the West Campus Housing System, is named in her honor.

Her life experiences included activist, social worker, YWCA secretary, labor educator, post World War II advisor in Germany on reconstituting German labor unions, professor, university ombudsman, and researcher. Cook was appointed Cornell University's first ombudsman and worked to establish the credibility and acceptance of that office.

== Autobiography ==
A Lifetime of Labor: the autobiography of Alice H. Cook / foreword by Arlene Kaplan Daniels. 1st ed. New York: Feminist Press at the City University of New York, 1998.
