= Henry Woodhouse (forger) =

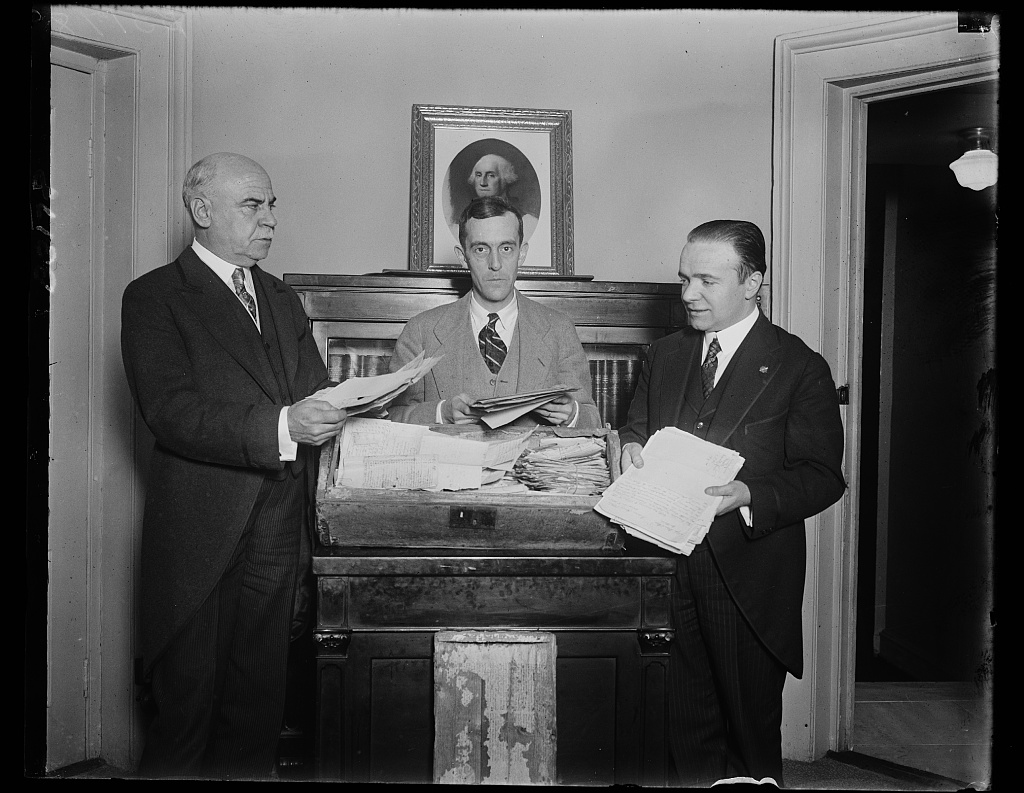
Henry Woodhouse (far right), c. 1929, presenting newly discovered family papers of George Washington to officials

Henry Woodhouse (1884–1970) was an Italian-born US aviation writer, magazine publisher, investor, and collector.

== Early life ==
Henry Woodhouse was born Mario Terenzio Enrico Casalegno on June 24, 1884, in Turin, Italy. According to his own later account, Woodhouse's father died before he finished school. The young Woodhouse had to settle his father's debts using unspecified means. He later pursued academics in France, Britain, Switzerland and Belgium, and studied languages, economics, sociology and aeronautics. The schools he attended were never mentioned by name.

In 1904, Casalengo moved to the US and got a job in a restaurant kitchen in Troy, New York. He got into a fight with the head chef and killed him with a kitchen knife. Casalengo maintained that the other man had accidentally impaled himself on the knife. He was arrested and sentenced to four years in Clinton Prison in Dannemora, New York. He was released in 1909.

== Aviation ==
=== Writing ===
Soon after 1909 he submitted his naturalization papers. He began his career as an aviation writer under the nom de plume Henry Woodhouse, which he soon legally adopted. He published articles in Collier's Weekly, McClure's, Metropolitan, The Independent, World's Work, and the New York Times. He gained fame as an expert on the subject of aviation around the world. In his articles Woodhouse prophesied the development and extensive use of aeroplanes by the US military, and later coordinated uses for all branches of the service in WWI. He also accurately forecast the importance of aviation to the transportation industry, and postal service. Woodhouse authored several of the first authoritative books on aviation including Textbook of Naval Aeronautics (1917), Textbook of Military Aeronautics (1917), Textbook of Applied Aeronautic Engineering (1917), Textbook of Aerial Laws (1917), Aircraft of All Nations (1917), and High-altitude Flying in Relation to Exploration (1919).

=== Publishing ===
With the support of Robert J. Collier, he founded a successful magazine, Flying, and became its managing editor. It was considered from its inception to be the most comprehensive and authoritative publication on aviation in the US. Despite a few name changes over the years, Flying is still in circulation today, and is the most widely read aviation publication in the world.

Woodhouse also published other magazines such as Naval Aeronautics, Air Power and Scientific Age.

=== Other involvement with aviation ===
In 1915 Woodhouse helped found the American Society of Aeronautic Engineering. He was one of the original founders and a governor of the Aeroclub. He founded the National Aeroplane Fund to support national defense during WWI, the Aeronautic Federation of the western Hemisphere, and the Patriotic Education Society. He was the director of the American Society of Aeronautic Engineers. He was a permanent delegate to the Conference Committee on National Preparedness, and appointed by NYC Mayor Mitchell to the Committee of 1000. He was a delegate to the second Pan-American Scientific Congress. Woodhouse held memberships in dozens of important clubs, organizations, and societies throughout his lifetime. These were not only related to aviation, but also economic, civic, and scientific.

Woodhouse also owned copyrights to many aviation related terms and titles. He was awarded a $25,000 judgement against the famous 1927 movie Wings when the court found that the title was a copyright infringement against Woodhouse's intellectual property.

=== Aero Club ===
When the members of the Aero Club began to split over disagreements about the funds of the Manufacturer's Aircraft Association in 1917–1918, one member, J. C. Mars, accused Woodhouse of being a murderer and a draft dodger. In 1920 Woodhouse sued the club to stop its merger with the American Flying Club. When other members of the Aero Club tried the same merger in 1922, he sued again, claiming that he held the proxy votes of 404 members—but he could not present their signatures in court when ordered to do so. During this court battle, the New York Times wrote an article about the man he had killed. With his reputation damaged, Woodhouse lost his case and the Aero Club then became the National Aeronautic Association. Woodhouse threw his support to a minor rival organization, the Aerial League of America.

== Oil speculation ==
In 1920–1922, Woodhouse had a hand in forming of an oil syndicate, the Ottoman American Development Company, that - through his connection to admiral Colby M. Chester - gained rights to construct and operate a railroad from Anatolia and the Black Sea and to the exploitation of the oil fields of Mosul. Woodhouse owned 1/6 of the capital stock. He was also a director of the Turco-American Corporation, which had options to build the city of Ankara. Woodhouse supported the French foreign policy, which wanted to return the defeated sultan to his throne to keep the Ottoman Empire together. His plans fell apart when Kemal Atatürk ousted the sultan. The Ottoman Empire was thereby fragmented and the Mosul oil fields became part of Iraq.

== George Washington ==
Woodhouse collected artifacts and antiques that were connected to the history of the United States. In 1930 he acquired a famous oil portrait of Ulysses Grant. In 1936, in conjunction with one of George Washington's descendants, William Selden Washington, Woodhouse donated many documents on George Washington to the Library of Congress. This collection is still in the Library's permanent collection and can be found on their website.

Woodhouse also joined forces with another descendant, William Lanier Washington, and began to sell items with the Washington family crest through Woodhouse's gallery in New York City. Lanier Washington was relatively famous at the time for having portions of his own private collection of George Washington memorabilia sold at two prominent auctions conducted by Sotheby's in 1917 and the American Art Association in 1920. The authenticity of some of the Lanier Washington historical items, both sold through auction, and through the Woodhouse gallery, was later questioned and in some cases proven to be fraudulent.

== George Washington Air Junction ==
In 1928-1930, Woodhouse bought more than 1500 acres (6 km^{2}) of land south of Washington D.C., much of it being the ancestral lands of George Washington and George Mason. He planned to build a large zeppelin airport on the grounds, the George Washington Air Junction. By 1935 he had to sell the land to pay for unpaid taxes and foreclosures of mortgages. Much of this land is now Huntley Meadows Park.

== Last years ==
In 1953–1958 Woodhouse was involved in a lawsuit with former employee Tamara Bourkoun, who claimed that she had worked in his galleries for 46 weeks and had not been paid. Woodhouse claimed that her compensation was a tuition to the gallery's education courses and that she intended to become a fortune teller, which, at the time, was illegal in New York. The suit was decided in favor of Bourkoun. Woodhouse had to sell the last of the Washington Junction land to pay for her compensation.

Henry Woodhouse died on January 6, 1970, in his home in New York City.
