= Princeton Day School =

Private school in Princeton, New Jersey, US

Princeton Day School (since 1965) Princeton Country Day School (1932–1965)

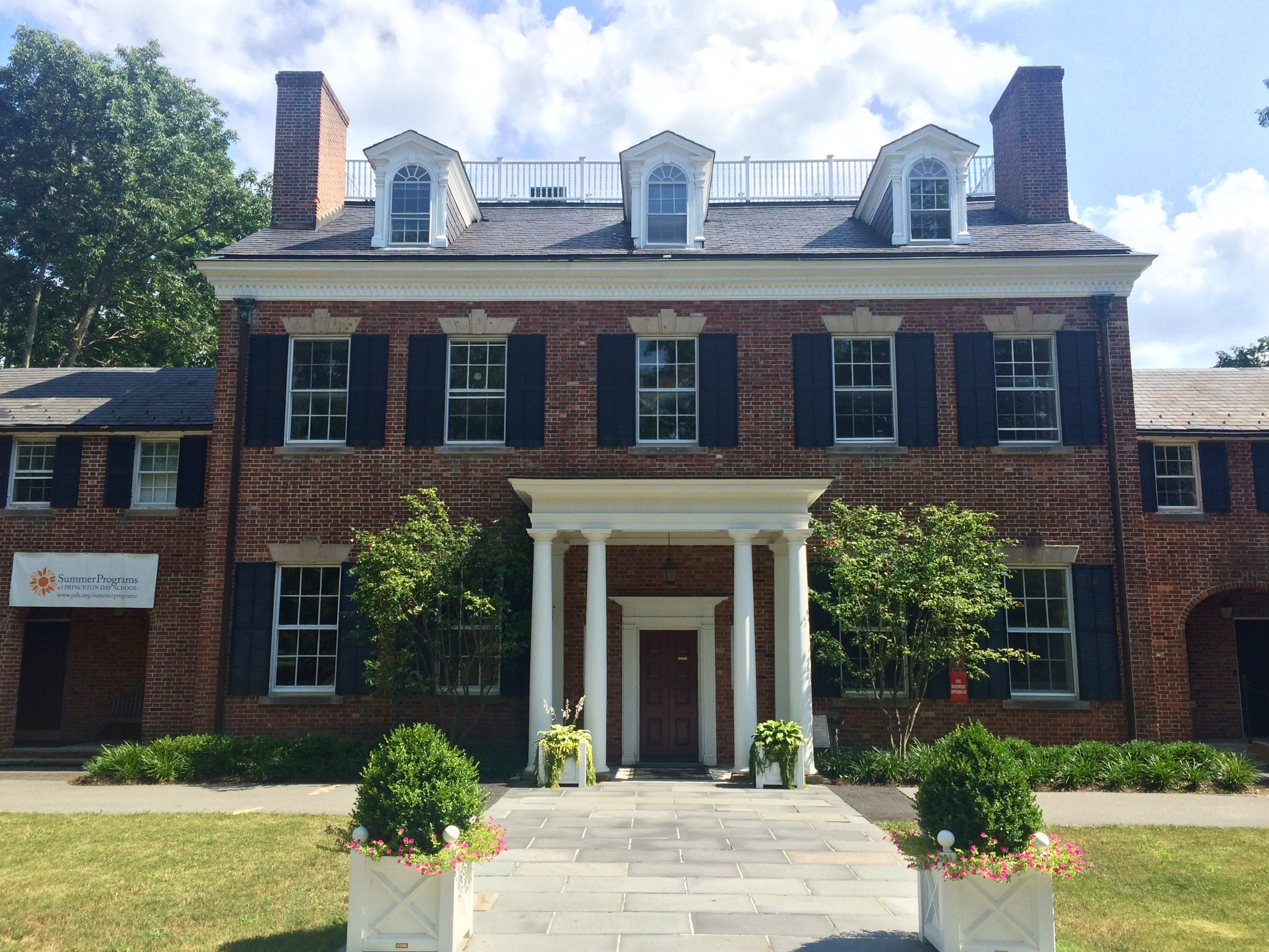
- Colross, the school administration building, a Georgian mansion moved from Alexandria, Virginia

Location
- Princeton, Mercer County, New Jersey; United States; 40°21′43″N 74°41′26″W

Information
- Type: Private, Independent
- Motto: Semper Luceat (Always Shine)
- Established: 1899
- NCES School ID: 00868462
- Head of school: Kelley Nicholson-Flynn
- Faculty: 128.1 FTEs
- Grades: PreK–12
- Gender: coeducational
- Enrollment: 952 (plus 20 in PreK, as of 2023–24)
- Student to teacher ratio: 7.4:1
- Campus: 103 acres (0.42 km^{2})
- Colors: Blue and white
- Athletics: 22 interscholastic sports
- Athletics conference: Colonial Valley Conference
- Team name: Panthers
- Accreditation: Middle States Association of Colleges and Schools Commission on Elementary and Secondary Schools
- Newspaper: Spokesman
- Yearbook: Link
- Endowment: $43,000,000
- Tuition: $45,360 (7–12 for 2023–24)
- Website: www.pds.org

Princeton Day School is a private coeducational day school located in Princeton, in Mercer County, in the U.S. state of New Jersey, serving students in pre-kindergarten through twelfth grade. The largest division is the Upper School (grades 9–12), with an enrollment of about 420. The school has been accredited by the Middle States Association of Colleges and Schools Commission on Elementary and Secondary Schools since 1989.

As of the 2023–24 school year, the school had an enrollment of 952 students (plus 20 in PreK) and 128.1 classroom teachers (on an FTE basis), for a student–teacher ratio of 7.4:1.

The school is a member of the National Association of Independent Schools, New Jersey Association of Independent Schools and the Association of Delaware Valley Independent Schools.

== History ==
Founded in 1899, Miss Fine's School in Princeton prepared girls for college with a curriculum including English, French, Latin, history, and mathematics, at a time when women were not expected to attend college, and when only one out of eight children in America went to school at all. For years, in addition to serving as headmistress, May Margaret Fine taught all the subjects but French and even "tended the furnace....often leaving in the middle of Latin class to do it."

"A large shapeless figure [with] a pile of white hair dominated by a bun on the top, which usually slid over to the side of her head by the end of the day," Fine was, despite her appearance, a loved and respected figure. John Finley, editor of The New York Times during the 1910s, wrote of her, "So was the school under her wise and gentle rule a place where happy children grew into her spirited likeness." Fine retired in 1931 and died two years later.

Miss Fine's School moved into what had previously been The Princeton Inn on Bayard Lane in 1924 and included boys from kindergarten through 3rd grade.

In 1924, a group of parents established a 4–9 grade school for boys on Bayard Lane, next to Miss Fine's School. The boys' school was known as Princeton Junior School. The school moved in 1932 to an independent campus with purpose-built buildings at 171 Broadmead in another section of Princeton not far from Palmer Stadium. The name was then changed to Princeton Country Day School (PCD), although in honor of its founding name, the school magazine was called the "Junior Journal." It had large playing fields across the street for football and soccer. In the winter, there was occasionally skating on Carnegie Lake nearby, and while ice hockey was played at Princeton University's Baker Rink. In the spring, there was an annual school fair held as a fundraiser. The school had an excellent academic reputation, and most graduates went on to New England boarding schools for secondary education. The buildings and campus of PCD are now part of Princeton University and used as a nursery school.

Princeton Country Day merged with Miss Fine's School in 1965 to become Princeton Day School, operating on a campus along the Great Road in Princeton.

In September 2005, the school launched the public phase of a five-year $50 million capital campaign, "Investing in Excellence" to support new and renovated facilities and increased endowment for faculty salaries and financial aid that raised a total of $53 million from more than 4,000 contributors.

== Traditions ==
Over the years, Princeton Day School enjoyed many traditions that no longer take place. These include an Upper School pie-eating competition that continued until the eighties, an annual sophomore-junior canoeing trip, intended to bridge the gap between two grades that traditionally do not share many classes, and legendary English teacher Anne Shepherd's wreathmaking assembly. The wreathmaking rite started in Miss Fine's School in 1900, and since, by the 1980s, participation in the event had dwindled, it was cancelled. A December 1982 article in PDS's student-run newspaper, The Spokesman, explained that "This [announcement] raised such an uproar that, by popular demand, the [assembly] was given one last chance." By the 1990s, though, wreathmaking was gone, indicative of the passing of certain traditions over time. (Another tradition that began at Miss Fine's, the annual Maypole Dance, actually continues today, though it is now performed by second graders instead of Upper Schoolers.)

New traditions have joined the Maypole Dance in recent years, including the annual Powder Puff game, a fiercely competitive flag football match between the junior and senior girls that has been held since 2004, and Dr. Seuss Day.

=== Blue & White Day ===
On Blue & White Field Day, an all-school athletic competition held each spring, PDS students often carry a fierce 24-hour sense of patriotism for their color, which is assigned in their first year and remains through graduation. Popular Blue & White Day events include The Big Race, which involves students in each grade from PreK through 12, a faculty balloon toss (for which students serve as rowdy spectators), and the freestyle sack race.

Blue & White Day was founded by beloved Physical Education teacher Kim Bedesem; when Bedesem died in 1993, it was decided that each subsequent Blue & White Day be dedicated to her. Each year, the Blue & White Day T-shirts distributed to students and faculty have the name "KIM" somewhere in the design. While Bedesem created Blue & White Day in its present form in the 80s, similar events existed at Miss Fine's and PCD as much as 60 years earlier. James Howard Murch, PCD's first Headmaster, was remembered by his successor for "the pleasurable relish with which he took to interpret[ing] the decimal-splitting rivalries of the Blues and Whites." Miss Fine's School (whose school colors were voted Blue and Grey by the Class of 1918) had "similar challenges" in which Blues and Greys competed.

The Upper School (grades 9–12) returned to Blue and White Day in 2006 following over a decade's hiatus from the event. Their re-entry into the morning part of the activities was later expanded to include other Blue/White competitions in the Upper School during the rest of the school year.

== Administration ==
On June 16, 2022, the Princeton Day School Board of Trustees unanimously voted to appoint Kelley Nicholson-Flynn, former assistant head of school for operations at Riverdale Country School in the Bronx, as the new Head of School starting July 2023.

== Facilities ==
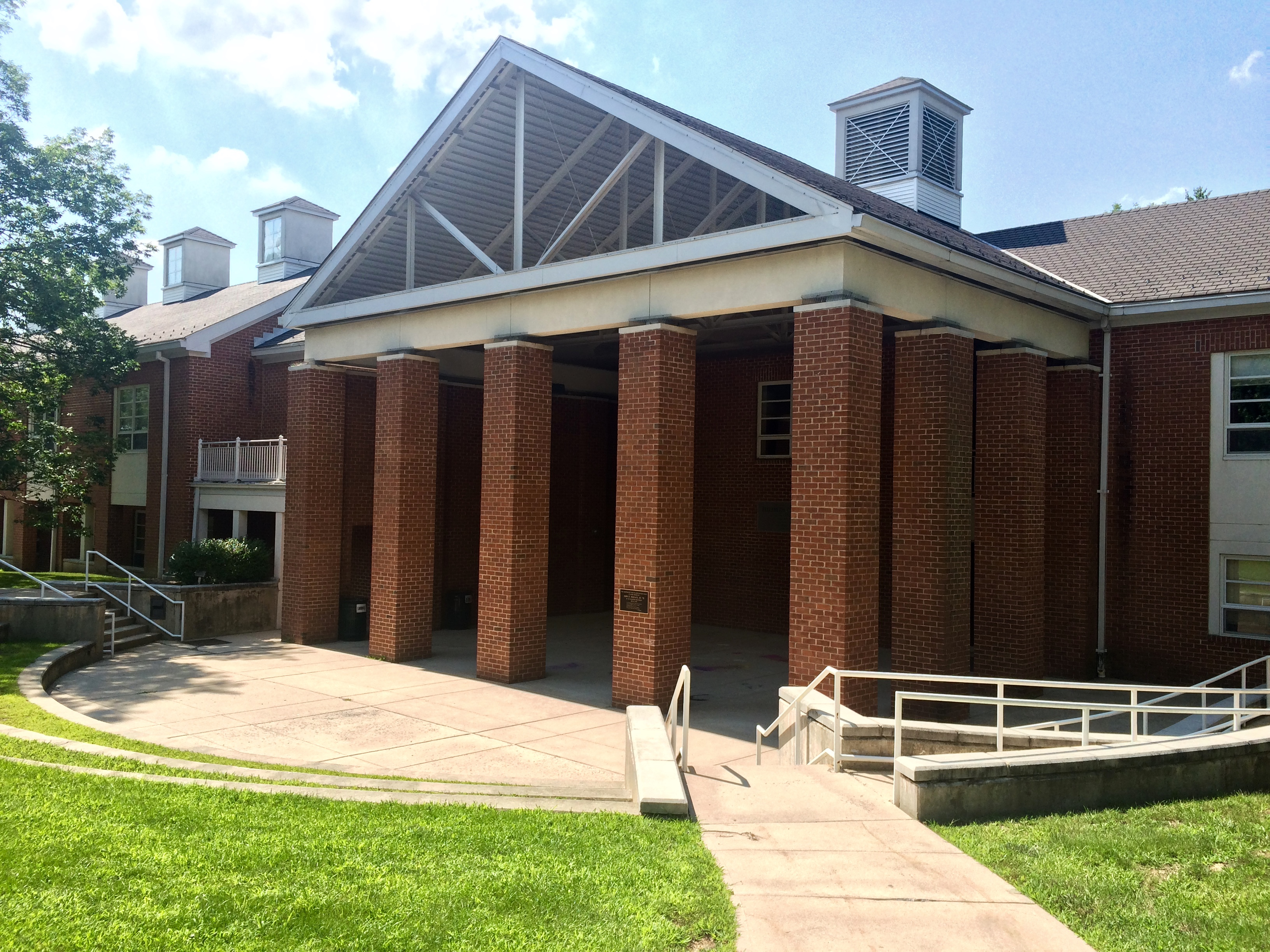

Princeton Day School completed a $60 million comprehensive capital campaign in 2021 that included a new, state-of-the-art LEED-certified athletic center. Previous construction and renovations were completed in September 2007 and include doubling the size and adding a variety of new technologies to their middle and upper school libraries. A new art center houses studios for architecture, ceramics, painting/drawing, woodworking, photography, and cinematic arts. The school's music facilities have been expanded to include a recording studio and new practice areas to accommodate a growing choral and instrumental music program. In 2019, PDS began construction on a new athletic center, which will hold four international squash courts, two all-purpose athletic courts, changing rooms, offices, and a large commons area attached to the existing Lisa McGraw Skating Rink.

== Clubs and activities ==
Student-run publications at Princeton Day School include The Spokesman, an award-winning Upper School newspaper published eight times a year, which uses a staff of 19 editors and two faculty advisors, and its middle school sister publication, known as Spokes. Each year, the student-led literary and arts magazine cymbals is also published, along with the annual yearbook, the Link.

Clubs offered in the Upper School at PDS (many of which are created by a student's or group of students' initiative) include Model United Nations, the Mock trial, the Debate Club, the Foreign Affairs club, Science Olympiad, the Science Club, the EnAct (Environmental Action) club, the Pet and Wildlife Salvation (PAWS) Club, the India Club, the French Club, the Latin Club, the Chinese Club, Chamber Music Club, Dance Club, Girls Who Code, Gallery Club, Mathletics, the National Organization for Women (NOW), Tabletop Gaming Club, Student Progressive Coalition, the Spanish Club (which holds a popular annual Salsa Cook-off in March), various A-Capella groups and the Science League Team.

PDS also offers several affinity groups for students to join, including the Asian Pacific Islander Desi American (APIDA) Affinity Group, PRIDE (for students who identify as part of the LGBTQ+ community), Black Student Union, Latinx Student Union, Multiracial Student Union, and the Jewish Union.

Students may also be selected to lead in the Peer Group program, and may be elected to serve on the Student Council, Student Ambassadors Committee, and Judiciary Committee.

== Sports teams ==
The Princeton Day School Panthers compete under the supervision of the New Jersey State Interscholastic Athletic Association.

Middle and Upper School sports teams at PDS include:

- Fall: Boys and Girls Soccer, Girls Tennis, Boys and Girls Cross-Country, Girls Field Hockey Boys Football was dropped in 2011 due to a lack of sufficient numbers of interested players.
- Winter: Boys and Girls Basketball, Coed Squash (upper school only), Coed Fencing, Boys and Girls ice hockey, Girls Volleyball
- Spring: Boys Baseball, Boys and Girls Lacrosse, Boys Tennis, Girls Softball, Coed Golf (upper school only), Coed Figure skating (upper school only)

NJISAA Prep State Championships

- Boys' Ice hockey: 1981–82 1988–89, 1989–1990 1998, 1999, 2000, 2001, 2002, 2003, 2004, 2006, 2011, 2013, 2014
- Coed Figure skating: 2000, 2001, 2006, 2008
- Girls' Ice hockey: 1998–99, 2001–02
- Girls' Softball: 1993, 1996, 2006
- Boys' Tennis: 1980, 1981, 1992, 1993, 1994, 1995, 1996, 1997, 1999, 2005, 2006, 2007, 2008, 2009, 2013
- Girls' Basketball: 1990, 1995, 2000
- Girls' Lacrosse: 1981, 1982, 1983, 1984, 1985, 1986, 1987, 1995
- Boys' Football: 1973, 1974, 1975, 1980
- Boys' Lacrosse: 1974, 1975, 1976, 1977, 1980, 1981, 1985, 1993, 1994, 1995, 1996
- Boys' Basketball: 1973–74, 1974–75, 1975–76, 1977–78, 1979–80, 1984–85, 1991–92, 1994–95, 1996–97, 1998–99, 2015–16, 2019–20
- Baseball: 1971, 1972, 1977, 1991, 1992, 1998, 2001, 2010
- Boys' Cross Country: 1974, 1978, 1979, 1991, 1992, 2002, 2009, 2010, 2024
- Girls' Cross Country: 2022
- Boys' Soccer: 1971, 1973, 1976, 1977, 1978, 1981, 1982, 1983, 1986, 2010
- Golf: 1992, 1993, 1994, 1995
- Fencing: 1995, 1996, 2008
- Girls' Soccer: 1979, 1980, 1981, 1982, 1989, 1993, 1994, 1997, 2002, 2008, 2010, 2014, 2015
- Field Hockey: 1976, 1978, 1981, 1984, 1985, 1986, 1992, 1995, 1996, 1997, 1998, 2016
- Volleyball: 1977, 1982, 1983, 1993, 1994
- Girls' Tennis: 2002, 2008, 2009, 2012, 2013, 2014, 2015

NJSIAA State Championships

- Girls' Soccer: 2023
- Boys' Cross Country: 2024
- Girls' Ice Hockey: 2025

Boys' soccer won the 2010 Mercer County Tournament with a 1–0 win over three-time defending champion Princeton High School and took the Prep B state championship with a 2–1 win over Gill St. Bernard's School, the program's first state title since 1986.

Girls' lacrosse won the 2010 Mercer County Tournament with an 11–8 victory over Stuart Country Day School.

Girls' tennis won the 2014 Prep B state championship, defeating Gill St. Bernard's School to earn their third consecutive state championship by only one point.

Boys’ basketball won the 2020 Prep B state championship with a 64–50 victory over Doane Academy.

== Notable alumni ==
- George Akerlof (born 1940), Nobel laureate for Economics
- Lylah M. Alphonse (born 1972; class of 1990), journalist at The Boston Globe, who was Managing Editor/News at U.S. News & World Report
- Jake Alu (born 1977), former professional baseball infielder who played for the Washington Nationals
- Trey Anastasio (born 1964; class of 1982, but transferred to Taft School in Connecticut) singer and guitarist for Phish
- Nancy M. Bonini (born 1959, class of 1977), neuroscientist and geneticist
- Mary Chapin Carpenter (born 1958; class of 1976, but transferred to Taft School in Connecticut), country music singer-songwriter and guitarist
- Zach Cherry (born 1987), actor and comedian, who has appeared on the Apple TV+ series Severance
- Ruth Cleveland (1891–1904), eldest of five children born to 22nd and 24th United States president Grover Cleveland, who was popularly known as "Baby Ruth"
- Chris Conley (born 1980; class of 1998), lead singer of Saves the Day
- Jon Drezner, architect and designer
- Joe Gallo (born 1980), college basketball head coach for the Merrimack Warriors men's basketball team
- Donald Gips (born 1960, class of 1978), Chief Domestic Policy Advisor to Vice President Al Gore and appointed United States Ambassador to South Africa by Barack Obama
- John W. Hartmann (born 1967) politician who served in the New Jersey General Assembly from the 15th Legislative District from 1992 to 1994
- Stefan Hirniak (born 1985, class of 2003), swimmer for the Canadian national teams who holds two Canadian swimming records and set a world swimming record for butterfly
- Antoine Hoppenot (born 1990; class of 2008), professional soccer player for the Philadelphia Union who selected Hoppenot in the third round (No. 51 overall) of the 2012 MLS Supplemental Draft
- Patrick Kerney (born 1976; class of 1994), professional football player and Pro Bowl defensive end for the Seattle Seahawks who played freshman season for PDS before moving on to the Taft School in Connecticut
- Wesley Leggett (born 2001), soccer player who plays as a forward for the USL Championship club Loudoun United FC
- Tom Marshall (born 1963; class of 1982), Phish lyricist
- Peter McLoughlin (born 1957; class of 1975, but transferred to Deerfield Academy in Massachusetts), President of the NFL's Seattle Seahawks
- Rachel Lambert Mellon (1910–2014), horticulturalist, gardener, philanthropist and art collector
- Lyle and Erik Menendez, convicted of killing their parents in 1989
- Ben Mezrich (born 1969; class of 1987), author of Bringing Down the House and The Accidental Billionaires, which were made into the movies 21 and The Social Network, respectively
- Robert Mueller (1944–2026; class of 1959), 6th director of the FBI (2001–13), Special Counsel in 2017 U.S. election investigation
- Davon Reed (born 1995), basketball player for the Denver Nuggets
- Christopher Reeve (1952–2004; class of 1970), actor, director and activist, best known for his role as the title character in the Superman films
- David Soloway (class of 1997), member of Saves the Day
- Carl Sturken (born 1955; class of 1973), songwriter and record producer
- Kara Swisher (born 1963; class of 1980), technology columnist; host of the On with Kara Swisher podcast and co-host of the Pivot podcast with Scott Galloway. She founded All Things Digital and served as its co-executive editor with Walt Mossberg
- Marina von Neumann Whitman (1935–2025; class of 1952), economist, writer and automobile executive, only daughter of the polymath John von Neumann
- Marjorie Williams (1958–2005; class of 1975), editor and columnist for the Washington Post
