= Thomas Mason (1753–1800) =

American politician (1753–1800)

Member of the Virginia House of Delegates representing Prince William County
- In office December 2, 1799 – September 18, 1800 Serving with John Pope, Mathew Harrison
- Preceded by: Edmund Brooke
- Succeeded by: Richard Brent

Personal details
- Born: May 1, 1753 Fairfax County, Virginia
- Died: September 18, 1800 (aged 47) Woodbridge, Prince William County, Virginia
- Spouse: Sarah Barnes Hooe
- Children: 4
- Parent(s): George Mason IV; Ann Eilbeck
- Occupation: planter, businessperson, politician

Thomas Mason (May 1, 1753 – September 18, 1800) was an American businessman, planter and politician. As a son of George Mason, a Founding Father of the United States, Mason was a scion of the prominent Mason political family.

== Early life and education ==
Mason was born at Gunston Hall in Fairfax County, Virginia on May 1, 1753. He was the youngest child and son of George Mason IV and his first wife Ann Eilbeck, who would die three years later, of complications giving birth to Mason's youngest sister. In 1775, his maternal grandmother Sarah Eilbeck died, and according to the terms of her will, young Thomas became the master of an enslaved boy of about his age, James, son of Moll (27 slaves were willed to the 7 Mason children). While a Thomas Mason represented Norfolk County in the House of Burgesses in 1696, these Masons were descended from the emigrant George Mason who represented Stafford County in that session.

Thomas Mason received a private education suitable to his class. His eldest sister, Nancy assumed her mother's position as mistress of the house until their widowed father remarried seven years later, to the spinster Sarah Brent, who was familiar with running large estates from her duties in caring for her father, an ally of the Mason family. The elder Mason preferred Scottish tutors for his sons, and David Constable, a graduate of the College of Aberdeen, arrived at Gunston Hall in 1774 and (despite refusing to take the Oath of Allegiance to Virginia) remained until 1781, when he left for property owned by his family on St. Christopher Island in the British West Indies. After his departure, the elder Mason sent Thomas and his slightly elder brother John to a school established by the Reverend Buchanan in Stafford County (near his Aquia Church parish). In 1788, although John Mason was sent to study in Maryland, Thomas and his step cousin George Graham were sent to the newly established Fredericksburg Academy in Fredericksburg, Virginia, one of the trustees of which was his cousin James Mercer. After completing his formal education at Fredericksburg Academy, Mason trained to be a merchant under an apprenticeship with William Hodgson in Alexandria, much as his slightly older brother John Mason had with Alexandria merchant John Hartshorne (although the other elder brothers received no such apprenticeship).

== Career ==
Following his apprenticeship in Alexandria, Mason's father set him up with a business in Richmond. By that date, John Mason had also relocated to Richmond, where he was a partner in Fenwick and Mason, which traded with merchants in Bordeaux, France, then in turmoil due to the French Revolution. Their father George Mason instructed John to mentor his younger brother, and Thomas may have worked as the family debt collector or as a merchant in his own right by his father's death in late 1792.

He and John presented their father's 1773 will (written shortly after his first wife's death) and at least one authenticating witness (subscribers having been Gustavus Scott, Elizabeth Bronaugh, Ann Cockburn, John West Jr., Robert Graham and John Davidson) to the Fairfax County Court. By then no guardians for the children were necessary and their eldest brother George (one named executor) died in 1796 and the other named executor Martin Cockburn having declined executor's duties, John and Thomas Mason became the executors of their father's estate, and wealthy. By September 25, 1797, Thomas Mason relocated back to Prince William county and operated a store. He may have been the wealthiest man in Prince William county by the time of his (early) death in 1800, although he also had significant debts. In 1800, Thomas Mason owned four land parcels totaling 1,003 acres and paid the most of any county resident in personal property tax, including on one tithed white servant, 21 adult enslaved blacks, four black slaves between 13 and 16 years old, and 33 enslaved blacks either considered children or elderly.

Thomas Mason also began his short political career, as Prince William County voters elected him as one of their delegates to the Virginia House of Delegates in 1799, and re-elected him the following year, although he died before the next session.

Thomas Mason inherited his father's properties on the southern side of the Occoquan River across from Colchester as well as the right to operate the Occoquan ferry.

Mason named his plantation Woodbridge after the wooden toll bridge he built in 1795 to replace the ferry. Sources differ as to which renowned inventor and engineer designed the bridge, Theodore Burr of Connecticut (not definitively known to have worked south of Port Deposit, Maryland), or Timothy Palmer of Massachusetts, who was constructing the Little Falls Bridge across the Potomac River in 1795 and a preeminent bridgebuilder of the era, perhaps best known for a bridge in Philadelphia (Mason requested a higher toll rate from the Virginia General Assembly in 1797 based on the high cost of Massachusetts workmen). The toll bridge carried King's Highway (present-day U.S. Route 1) across the Occoquan River.

== Marriage and children ==
The orphaned Thomas Mason married Sarah Barnes Hooe, daughter of Gerard Hooe and Sarah Barnes, at Lexington plantation in Fairfax County, Virginia on April 22, 1793. Sarah was a sister of his elder brother George Mason V's wife, Elizabeth "Betsey" Mary Ann Barnes Hooe. The couple had four children:

- Patsy Mason Lake (1796-1873)
- Elizabeth Mason
- Gerard Alexander Mason (December 1793–December 18, 1849)
- Leannah Mason Barron (1798–1824)
- Thomas Mason (1800–1828)

== Death and legacy ==
This Thomas Mason died, aged 47, on September 18, 1800, at Lexington plantation house, the nearby residence of his brother George's widow and her second husband (and Mason's former school mate) George Graham. Richard Brent filled the remainder of his term in the Virginia House of Delegates representing Prince William County. His widow Sarah B. Wilson filed no will, and pursuant to Virginia law was able to live the final 15 years of her life in their family home, Woodbridge with their eldest son Gerard, before also dying intestate. On October 8, 1800, the Prince William County Court accepted an inventory of Thomas's estate, including enslaved persons, performed by future delegate George Graham and others.

Thomas Mason's family continued to own the 500-acre Woodbridge plantation and bridge until 1851, when it was auctioned off following Gerard Alexander Mason's death. Gerard Mason was known as a harsh master, perhaps embodying his famous grandfather's aphorism, "Every Master is born a petty tyrant". He frequently advertised for runaway slaves with visible signs of physical injury, but had been acquitted in 1846 of murdering an enslaved woman named Katy whom he had stomped to death and buried months after beating her so severely that she could not walk. A neighbor found Gerard's (also sometimes spelled Jared's) corpse with head smashed by an axe in his own ferry house. Gerard had been killed by his slave Agnes, who was found guilty of murder and sentenced to death. Despite neighbors' petitions to the governor to commute her execution (to sale and transportation out of the state), on the grounds that Agnes had also been repeatedly abused, she was hanged.

Many of his descendants would also share the name Thomas Mason. Thomas Mason's grandson, by his youngest son, Thomas Jr., Berry Mason lived in Charles County, Maryland until his death. His will dated July 13, 1852, probated in Maryland, specifically forbade any of his property (if he had no living children) even if his (also unmarried) brother Thomas Mason had children from passing in any contingency to any Hooe, Barron or Grymes. In 1817 this Thomas Mason's eldest daughter, Leannah, had married William Barron and bore Thomas Mason Barron in Washington D.C. before that family moved to Kentucky. Thomas M. Barron married Penelope McFarland in 1842, and the only son of their seven children, William Thomas Barron, married and eventually became the grandfather of the first wife of hotelier Conrad Hilton (Mary Barron).
