= Lexington (plantation) =

Archaeological site in Virginia, United States

- U.S. National Register of Historic Places
- Virginia Landmarks Register
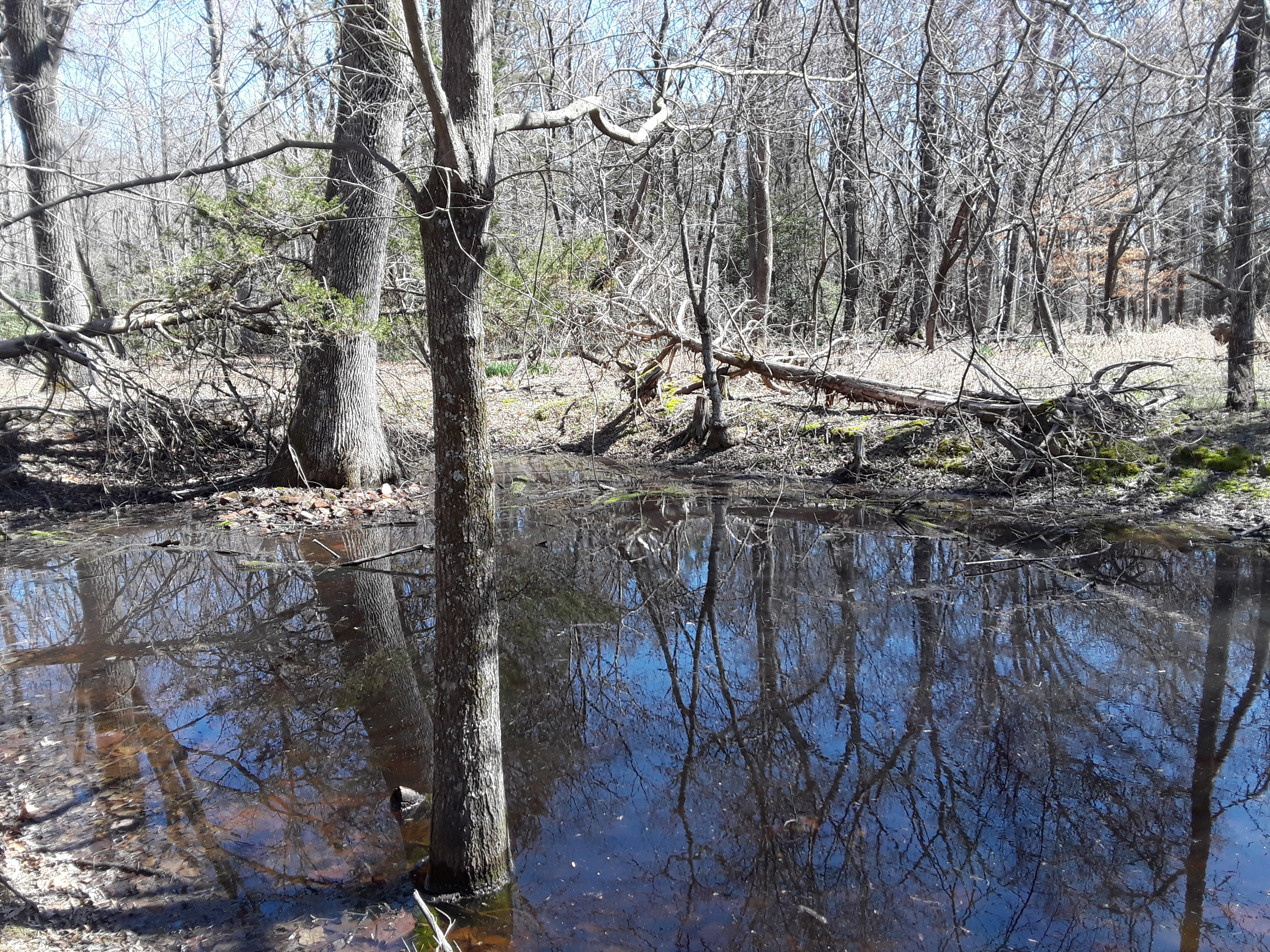
- Remains of the cellar at the house site, March 2018

- Location within Northern Virginia Location within Virginia Location within the United States
- Location: 7301 High Point Rd., near Lorton, Virginia
- Coordinates: 38°38′38″N 77°11′56″W
- Built: c. 1775
- NRHP reference No.: 13000336
- VLR No.: 029-5612

Significant dates
- Added to NRHP: May 28, 2013
- Designated VLR: June 18, 2009

Lexington was an 18th-century plantation on Mason's Neck in Fairfax County, Virginia, United States. The estate belonged to several generations of the Mason family, and is now part of Mason Neck State Park.

== History ==
=== As a plantation (18th century) ===
Lexington was originally part of the Gunston Hall plantation land tract, held by various members of the Mason family (one of the First Families of Virginia) for generations, and previously by members of the Doeg band of Native Americans.

George Mason IV, an active patriot and mentor of his neighbor General (then President) George Washington subdivided his property when his firstborn son George Mason V (1753-1796) reached legal age in 1774 (a year after his mother's death). The house was actually built beginning circa 1784, a year after that somewhat sickly son returned from a European trip taken for health and business reasons, and shortly before the son's marriage to Elizabeth Barnes Hooe, whose father operated the Barnesfield plantation in nearby King George County. Lexington's construction of wood rather than brick or stone like Gunston Hall, may indicate the economic constraints imposed by the American Revolutionary War upon the patriot family. Although they had six children (and documents confirm at least three were born at this plantation house), George Mason V would only acquire title to the plantation upon his father's death in 1792 (when the Fairfax County Circuit Court accepted and transcribed his father's lengthy and codicil-free will written in 1773 and named him the estate's executor) and only survived his father by four years. The name commemorates the Battle of Lexington in Massachusetts.

The surrounding plantation was used to grow tobacco (a resource intensive crop which led to soil depletion) and other crops by 1775.

=== Disrepair and the Mason family (19th century) ===
It fell into disrepair after the War of 1812, both because of soil depletion, and because George Mason V's son sold the property to his uncle William Mason of Mattawoman plantation in Maryland in 1818 (a year before his wife died and two years before his own death). William Mason had run the plantation during his elder brother George Mason V's European trip before the manor house's construction. Non-family managers had operated the Lexington plantation on behalf of the Mason descendants until they came of age, later on behalf of Mason family members who chose to live elsewhere. George Mason V's will declared that Lexington would become the property of his second son, William Eilbeck Mason (1788-1820), when he came of age, an event which would not occur until 1809, although it also allowed his widow to occupy the property for the rest of her life. In fact, a month after her husband's death, Elizabeth Barnes Mason gave birth to his posthumous third son, Richard Barnes Mason, who would become a career U.S. Army officer and temporary governor of the California territory before his death in 1850. George Mason V's eldest daughter Elizabeth Mary Ann Barnes Mason (9 March 1785–25 March 1827) married her distant relative Alexander Seymour Hooe, son of Seymour Hooe and Sarah Alexander, at Lexington on 22 April 1802. The following year, the widowed mother remarried, to George Graham, who had been educated alongside George Mason's two youngest sons before attending Columbia University in New York and returning to become a Virginia lawyer as well as operate his family's properties after his father died in 1796. Elizabeth Barnes Mason Graham died in May 1814, shortly before her husband's possibly most important military services assisting in the evacuation of Washington D.C. Their son George Mason Graham, born at Lexington, would like his half-brother fight in the Mexican–American War, as well as become rich operating his family's cotton plantation in Louisiana, before helping to found the educational institution which later became Louisiana State University. Meanwhile, after his wife's death and the war's end, George Graham accepted a job with the War Department in Washington D.C., and would later remarry as well as serve as Commissioner of the General Land Office.

William Stuart Mason, eldest son of George Mason IV's son William Mason acquired Lexington plantation circa 1824 and actually lived at Lexington until his death in 1857, but he also experienced financial troubles, so not only did much fall into disrepair, in 1851 a court required land to be sold to his younger brother (yet another) George Mason of Hollin Hall. George Mason of Hollin Hall tried to sell the plantation, but did not do so before his death, so in 1870 it became the property of his son, also named George Mason, on whose watch the wooden structure burned down.

=== Later existence (1888 – 1968) ===
When that George Mason (who never had children) died of typhoid fever in Portland, Oregon in 1888, the property, which was becoming overgrown, was inherited by his sister Kora Chase, who sold it in 1903 to James D. Yeomans, a local real estate speculator as well as member of the Interstate Commerce Commission. It then changed hands among various real estate investors and companies until 1967, when Wills & Van Metre, Inc. sold it to the Nature Conservancy, which was interested in the property because of two bald eagle nests discovered in 1965. It consolidated various parcels and in 1968 sold them to the Commonwealth of Virginia to become Mason Neck State Park, which opened in 1985.

=== As a park (1985 – present) ===
Archeologists investigated the Lexington site beginning around 2006. It was added to the National Register of Historic Places in 2013, in part because of its landscape design unearthed during those excavations, which resembles that of Gunston Hall, as well as Marlborough, a now defunct Stafford County plantation once the home of John Mercer, George Mason's relative, guardian during his minority and mentor, and who died in 1768.
