= George Mason Graham =

American academic administrator (1807–1891)

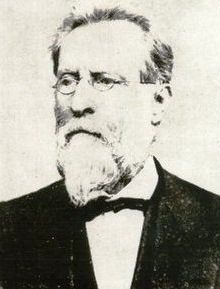

Personal details
- Born: August 21, 1807 Lexington plantation, Fairfax County, Virginia
- Died: January 31, 1891 (aged 83) Bayou Rapides, Louisiana
- Spouse(s): Esther Smit; Mrs. Stith
- Children: Duncan J. Graham, Fergus R. Graham, Mrs Amy B. Stafford, Caroline R. Graham
- Education: United States Military Academy(no degree); University of Virginia (no degree)

Military service
- Allegiance: United States
- Branch/service: Louisiana Militia
- Rank: Captain
- Unit: Company E, Third Louisiana Regiment
- Battles/wars: Mexican American War(Battle of Monterrey)

George Mason Graham (21 August 1807 – 31 January 1891), known as Mason Graham, was a Virginia-born lawyer, planter and educator. Sometimes called the “Father of LSU,” Graham became the first chairman of the board of trustees of the Louisiana State Seminary of Learning, the forerunner of Louisiana State University.

== Early and family life ==
Born to the widowed Elizabeth Hooe Mason and her second husband, George Graham, a Virginia lawyer who had been educated with the sons of George Mason. Since both his father and the father of his first step-siblings were named "George", the boy would usually be called "Mason", honoring the statesman. Although both the Hooe and Graham families were patriots and planters in Prince William County, Virginia, neither family had held the public offices nor had the high social status in Maryland and Virginia of the Masons, nor of the Catholic Brents (his paternal grandmother was Jane Brent). In fact, the first Graham in North America, Scottish merchant Richard Graham, had emigrated to Virginia in 1755. He married one of the four daughters of lawyer and planter George Brent; her eldest sister became the (childless) second wife of the statesman George Mason. George Brent's lawyer brother Richard Brent became a leading politician in the area, and eventually U.S. Senator. His youngest paternal uncle, Richard Graham, would also become a U.S. Army officer, served in the War of 1812, and eventually settled near St. Louis, Missouri and died in 1858.

Mason Graham had several step-brothers and step-sisters. The first group were the six children of his mother's first husband (the statesman's eldest son and principal heir, George Mason V). His father had helped his mother run some of the Mason family estates during their marriage. His mother died in 1814, when Mason was seven years old and his sister Mary three (two other full siblings failed to reach adulthood; Mary never married but instead become a nun and schoolteacher, including eventually of Mason's children). As a widower, George Graham took a job in the War Department in the new federal city, Washington, D.C. Eventually, George Graham became the War Department's chief clerk, and successfully completed troubleshooting trips to Texas and Louisiana. During their father's travels, Mason and Mary lived with the family of their uncle John Graham (also an early federal bureaucrat, the chief clerk of the State Department). No public schools existing at the time; Mason Graham attended private academies in Georgetown and Washington, D.C. However, John Graham died in 1820 shortly after returning from a mission to Portugal, when Mason was 13. Eventually, his father remarried, in 1825, and two of his three children of that marriage survived to adulthood. Although his father secured Mason Graham a coveted spot at the United States Military Academy at West Point, New York (as the nominee of Senator John Calhoun), Mason Graham resigned in April 1826. He eventually transferred to the University of Virginia, but dropped out at age 21, in 1828, a year short of graduation, in order to make his fortune in Louisiana, as discussed below.

Mason Graham married twice. His first wife, Esther, whom he married in 1834, died in 1835 and their infant lived barely a month. She was the daughter of fellow Virginian Richard Smith, chief cashier of the Second Bank of the United States, on whose board George Graham served. Mason Graham then sold that plantation and its slaves and returned to Washington. More than a decade later, on September 7, 1847, Mason Graham married Mary Eliza, the eldest daughter of Capt. N.G. Wilkinson, but she died on March 19, 1855, after giving birth to three sons and a daughter.

== Career ==
Graham sought his fortune in Rapides Parish in central Louisiana shortly after his marriage, farming cotton using enslaved labor. In 1823 his father invested in a cotton plantation with Louisiana's U.S. Senator (but usually referred to as Judge) Josiah S. Johnston. Johnston arrived in Washington that November, leaving overseers in charge of the plantation. George Graham sent 80 Negroes to Louisiana from those he owned at "Graham's Station" in Lewis County, Kentucky. Mason Graham took charge of the Louisiana plantation in 1828 and returned to Washington the following July, after replacing the overseers. However, while still en route to the national capital, in Columbus, Ohio, Mason Graham learned his father had died. Mason Graham then administered his father's estate in both Washington and Louisiana, knowing that the arrangement with Judge Johnston had never been committed to writing. However, good harvests in 1830 and 1831 enabled the younger Graham to buy out Johnston, then he sold that plantation to a neighbor who was a factor in New Orleans. Graham used the proceeds to buy the plantation of the late Charles T. Scott, and when his stepmother arrived, sold her children's slaves at her request. They were the progeny of "Codger", whom their grandfather George Brent had bequeathed to Sarah Brent, who in turn bequeathed them to her sister Jane Graham's children (although those that were bequeathed to Major Richard Graham had been transferred first from Graham's Station in Lewis County, Kentucky to the Florisante Valley near St. Louis when he ended his military career and became the Indian agent near St. Louis). By 1830, Mason Graham owned 112 enslaved people. John Grahams' son sent additional slaves from Graham's Station in Kentucky to Louisiana in November 1834, about a month after Mason Graham had returned to the national capital to marry. After this new wife's death in December 1835, Graham and his infant son mostly lived in the national capital, but spent winters in Louisiana. Two decades later, in 1850, Mason owned 87 enslaved people.

Meanwhile, in January 1842, Graham partnered with General Sprigg to buy Tyrone Plantation on Bayou Rapides. He returned to live mostly in Louisiana, and began a political career as an Adams and Clay Whig. Mason Graham attended the party's state and national political conventions, but voted against Mr. Watkins Leigh of Virginia, Clay's chief supporter. When war with Mexico over Texas loomed, General Taylor requested a militia brigade from Louisiana's governor. Graham recalled his military training and immediately ordered recruiting posters printed. He became the captain of the Rapides Horse Guards in 1843, which went to New Orleans to receive orders from Governor Isaac Johnson, which mustered them into service despite confusion over whether their service term was six or three months. They embarked for Point Isabell on May 11, 1843, only to find the fighting already over. Nonetheless, re-enlisting, they were transported to join Colonel (later Brigadier) John Garland's regular troops, then participated in the Battle of Monterrey. Afterward, Graham learned his cousin Lt. R.H. Graham had been mortally wounded in the battle, and he himself suffered from jaundice and so returned to Louisiana, only to find that General Sprigg's successor, Captain Mulhollon, had died and left only 80 bales of cotton from 500 acres and .

Mason Graham continued farming in Louisiana using enslaved labor until the American Civil War, marrying in 1847 and becoming widowed in 1855. However, the widow of one of his half brothers, George Mason VI, joined him and helped raise his children and settle Captain Mulhollon's estate that Mason Graham had purchased. However, Confederate and Union forces ruined both Graham's Louisiana plantation in 1863 and 1864. He remarried a childless relative on October 7, 1867, then was paralyzed for months after falling headfirst from a horse on October 9, 1868.

In 1853, Graham accepted Governor Hebert's appointment to the Board of Trustees of a proposed Seminary of Learning near Pineville in Rapides parish. However, despite transforming the governing body to a Board of Supervisors, buildings were not erected for many years notwithstanding state expenditures of more than a half million dollars. Thus in 1859, Graham suggested the board model the facility on the U.S. Military Academy at West Point, and following the suggestion of Major John Carlos Buell (who had married the widow of his youngest half brother, General Richard Barnes Mason), and despite opposition hired Major William T. Sherman as headmaster.

However, the American Civil War intervened, and Graham resigned from the educational board and spent some time in Virginia. In 1866 Governor James Madison Welles appointed Mason Graham as Adjutant General of Louisiana, heading the new militia. Graham also rejoined the educational board after 1872, when he partly resided in Louisiana, and returned to full involvement in the educational board from 1878 until 1885, when he resigned because of infirmity. He also was a candidate (though he never campaigned) for Congress, and lost to John E. King of St. Landry Parish. Thus, following the American Civil War, Graham established a seminary and military academy in, which would eventually move to Baton Rouge, Louisiana and become Louisiana State University.

It was said that “beyond family and intimate private affairs there was nothing closer to his heart than Louisiana State Seminary of Learning.” He died on January 31 1891 at 83

== Notes ==
- "LSU Foundation Laureate Society." 2009. LSU Foundation, Web. 26 Nov 2009.
