= Encoptolophus =

Scientific classification
- Kingdom: Animalia
- Phylum: Arthropoda
- Clade: Pancrustacea
- Class: Insecta
- Order: Orthoptera
- Suborder: Caelifera
- Family: Acrididae
- Subfamily: Oedipodinae
- Tribe: Chortophagini
- Genus: Encoptolophus; Scudder, 1875

Genus of grasshoppers

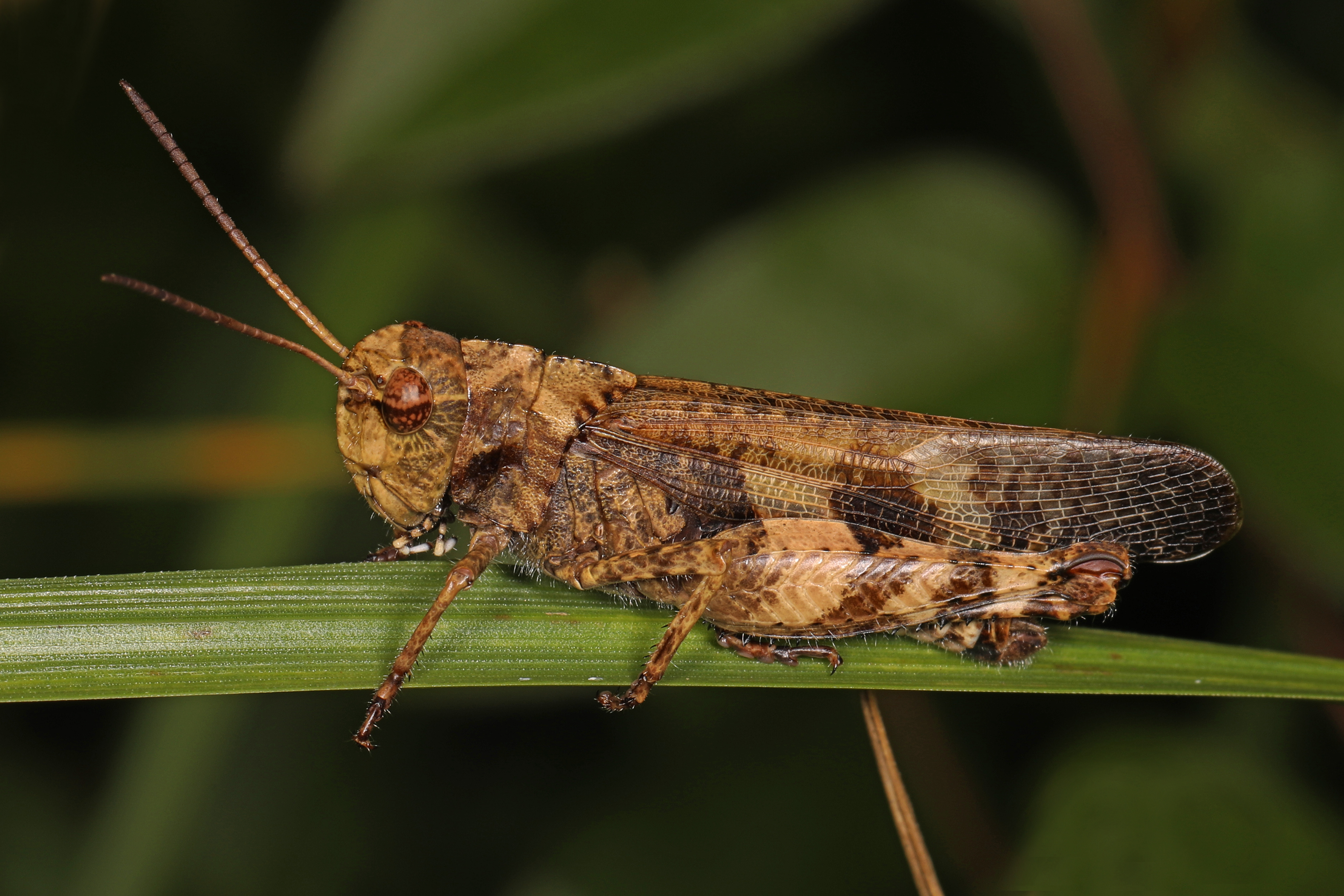
Encoptolophus sordidus in Mason Neck, Virginia, USA

Encoptolophus is a genus of band-winged grasshoppers in the family Acrididae. There are about 8 described species in Encoptolophus.

== Species ==
- Encoptolophus californicus Bruner, 1905
- Encoptolophus costalis (Scudder, 1863) (western clouded grasshopper)
- Encoptolophus fuliginosus Bruner, 1905
- Encoptolophus otomitus (Saussure, 1861)
- Encoptolophus pallidus Bruner, 1893 (pale clouded grasshopper)
- Encoptolophus robustus Rehn & Hebard, 1909 (coast clouded grasshopper)
- Encoptolophus sordidus (Burmeister, 1838) (clouded grasshopper)
- Encoptolophus subgracilis Caudell, 1903 (southwestern dusky grasshopper)
