= George Graham (soldier) =

United States government official (1770–1830)

Commissioner of the General Land Office
- In office June 26, 1823 – September 30, 1830
- President: James Monroe; John Quincy Adams; Andrew Jackson
- Preceded by: John McLean
- Succeeded by: Elijah Hayward

United States Secretary of War Acting
- In office October 22, 1816 – December 8, 1817
- President: James Madison; James Monroe
- Preceded by: William H. Crawford
- Succeeded by: John C. Calhoun

Member of the Virginia House of Delegates from the Fairfax County district
- In office December 5, 1808 – December 23, 1809 Serving with Thomson Mason
- Preceded by: George Summers
- Succeeded by: James H. Hooe

Personal details
- Born: May 16, 1770 Dumfries, Virginia, British America
- Died: August 9, 1830 (aged 60) Washington, D.C., U.S.
- Resting place: Arlington National Cemetery
- Education: Columbia University (BA)

Military service
- Allegiance: United States
- Branch/service: Virginia Militia
- Rank: Captain
- Unit: Fairfax Light Horse
- Battles/wars: War of 1812

Captain George Graham (May 16, 1770 – August 9, 1830), a Virginia planter, lawyer, soldier and politician became an early federal government bureaucrat. He served twice as acting United States Secretary of War, including during the transition between the administrations of Presidents James Madison and James Monroe (1816-1817), as well as Commissioner of the United States General Land Office (1823-1830) under Presidents John Quincy Adams and Andrew Jackson.

== Early and family life ==
George Graham was the eldest son of the former Jane Brent, and her merchant husband, Richard Graham, and born on May 16, 1770 near Dumfries in Prince William County, Virginia. He had two brothers - John and Richard - and a sister, Catherine.

The Brent family had emigrated to Maryland more than a century earlier to avoid persecution based on their Roman Catholic religion, and moved to Virginia to avoid political problems with the Maryland establishment, despite Roman Catholic religious practices being illegal in Virginia at the time. They operated plantations using enslaved labor. In fact, fellow northern Virginia planters tolerated the Brent family's quiet religious practices, and both his great-grandfather William Brent and his great uncle Richard Brent would win election to the Virginia House of Delegates (and Richard Brent to the U.S. House of Representatives after the American Revolutionary War). Furthermore, local Anglican clergymen officiated at the marriages both of Sarah Brent and earlier her sister Jane Brent (both daughters of Richard Brent's brother, planter/lawyer George Brent). George and John Graham inherited slaves from their maternal grandfather, as their father recited in his will.

The Graham family was also respectable, although not of top rank among the First Families of Virginia, in part because Richard Graham and his brother Reginald (and Edward, who soon returned) had emigrated from Cumberland county in northern England circa 1755. Richard's father, also Richard Graham, was the third son of Reginald Graham, third baronet of Norton-Conyers, and every generation of the family would use the names Richard and George. His father Richard Graham had helped found the town of Dumfries and became a prominent local patriot in the American Revolutionary War, one of the four member delegation that requested George Washington take command of the local Independent Militia in 1774, then one of three local militia captains serving under Col. William Grayson as well as serving as a member of the local Committee of Public Safety (alongside William and Hugh Brent and others). In 1783, Richard Graham became the Prince William County sheriff, as well as its tax collector, and posted the required bond.

Virginia not providing for public education in this era, when George was 10, his aunt Sarah Brent married the prominent patriot and widower George Mason, and young George Graham went with her to Gunston Hall, Mason's plantation house, to be educated alongside Mason's two youngest sons, John Mason and Thomas Mason (1770-1800). He and Thomas Mason were then sent to a newly established school in Fredericksburg, of which his benefactor's cousin John Mercer was on the Board of Trustees, before George Graham was sent to New York to complete his higher studies at Columbia College. He earned his degree in 1790 or 1792, then traveled to Edinburgh, Scotland for further studies.

== Personal life ==
Graham married twice. In 1803 he married the widow Mary Ann Barnes Hooe (1768-1814), the daughter of prominent local lawyer and landowner Gerald Hooe and widow (with six children) of George Mason V (his classmates' eldest brother, who had died in 1796). Mary Ann bore four additional children from this marriage before her death in 1814, of complications from the final childbirths. Although their first and last sons died as infants, their son George Mason Graham would become a lawyer, planter and officeholder in Louisiana, and their daughter Mary would become a Catholic nun (Sister Mary Bernard Graham a/k/a "Cousin Mollie" to the family) and schoolmistress at the Visitation Convent in Washington, D.C. Mary Anne Graham's final will (written six weeks before her death) gave three slaves to Richard Barnes Mason, two to George Mason Graham and several and their children to Mary Ann Jane Graham, although a codicil changed the two named negroes given to George Mason Graham to her daughter Sally B. Mason instead.

Eleven years later, in 1825, the widowed George Graham remarried, to Alexandria-born Jane Love Watson (1799-1869) (whose brother James M. Watson would rise to become a Commodore in the U.S. Navy), and they had at least three children. Their only son to survive to adulthood, Major George Richard Graham (1828-1889), served in the United States Marine Corps during the Mexican War and the American Civil War and afterward commanded the Mare Island Naval Shipyard, and their daughter Jennie Brent Graham (1826-1899) married Georgia-born career naval officer Henry Kollock Davenport, who likewise remained loyal during the American Civil War. In 1906, their grandson Adm. Richard Graham Davenport (whose military career had begun in the Civil War) reburied George and Mary Ann Graham in the family vault at Arlington National Cemetery, where two grandsons would also be buried.

== Career ==
Admitted to the Virginia bar, Graham practiced law in Dumfries (the Prince William county seat until 1803) and nearby areas, including neighboring Fairfax County. He also surveyed lands across the Appalachian Mountains in which his father had speculated, and later would speculate in land himself. In 1796, also the year of his father's death, Graham subscribed to the Quantico Creek Navigation Company, that strove to keep Dumfries as a navigable port, despite silting from Quantico Creek that in a couple of decades ended its overseas tobacco shipments. Like his father, and Mason and Brent friends, Graham owned slaves. Complicating matters, he also had a first cousin, Dr. George Graham, who operated the Graham plantation in Prince William County and had a medical practice there and in the nearest large town, Alexandria until his death in 1816.

Meanwhile, this George Graham moved to the Lexington plantation in nearby Fairfax County, which his wife had selected as her share of her first husband's estate. Fairfax County voters elected Graham and fellow lawyer Thomson Mason to the House of Delegates in 1808, although neither won re-election. Graham also served as a presidential elector for Presidents Jefferson (once) and Madison (twice).

During the War of 1812, Graham followed his family's tradition, volunteered to serve as captain of a cavalry company, sometimes called the Fairfax Light Horse or Dragoons. British ships anchored off Quantico Creek during the war, although local legend claimed a providential gale saved Dumfries from burning similar to that of the new national capital. Captain Graham's most important task may have occurred just months after his wife's death, when he led troops guarding gunpowder removed from the Washington Naval Yard magazine and taken to the Dulany Farm near Falls Church on September 6, 1814 (despite local consternation about the danger) before it was returned to the national capital on September 10, 1814. During that federal evacuation, Graham's former schoolmate John Mason, now a militia general, escorted President Madison, Attorney General Rush and others toward Salona, near the Little Falls of the Potomac River, to avoid British forces. The First Lady, Dolley Madison, went to Rokeby, the estate of her friend Matilda Lee Love, about a mile away, while various important government documents (including the Constitution and Declaration of Independence) were stored in a vacant farmhouse in Loudoun County renamed Rokeby in the 1880s.

Following the conflict, following his younger brother John Graham's precedent (President Jefferson having sent him to the newly acquired Louisiana Territory as secretary and President Madison having made him chief clerk to the Secretary of State, James Monroe, who also headed the War Department), the widower George Graham accepted a position with the War Department, and rose to become its Chief Clerk following the resignation of General Armstrong. On October 22, 1816, President Madison designated Graham Acting Secretary following William H. Crawford's promotion to the Department of the Treasury until Crawford's successor John C. Calhoun arrived and took over as Secretary on October 8, 1817. Outside of his Cabinet service, Graham may be best known for a mission to Galveston Island, Texas to persuade the small Bonapartist colony of Champ d'Asile (headed by General Charles Lallemand) to accept American jurisdiction. There he both met and corresponded with privateer Jean Laffite. This voyage is considered the first Anglo-American account of a sea voyage to Texas. Graham fell ill with acute dysentery on his return trip from Champ d'Asile, but was healed by Atakapa natives.

Following his federal service, Graham became president of the Washington branch of the troubled Bank of the United States (1819–1823), and closed the "Indian factorage" matter, which saved the government considerable money ($113,000 being transferred into the Treasury). During this period, his brother John died, but George remarried, to the daughter of a career naval officer as mentioned above.

Graham returned to federal service following the promotion of future Supreme Court justice John McLean to Postmaster General, this time as commissioner of the U.S. General Land Office. He served through the administrations of Presidents John Quincy Adams and Andrew Jackson until his death. In the 1830 federal census, George Graham owned an enslaved boy and two enslaved women, and his household included an additional three free Blacks.

== Death ==
Graham died at the home of Robert Young Brent (only son of his distant cousin Robert Brent, the former mayor of Washington, D.C.) in Maryland just outside Washington, D.C., on August 8, 1830. His wife survived him by several years, and would be buried with him at Oak Hill Cemetery, although both were later reburied at Arlington National Cemetery.

Political offices
Preceded by John McLean	Commissioner of the General Land Office; 1823–1830	Succeeded by Elijah Hayward
