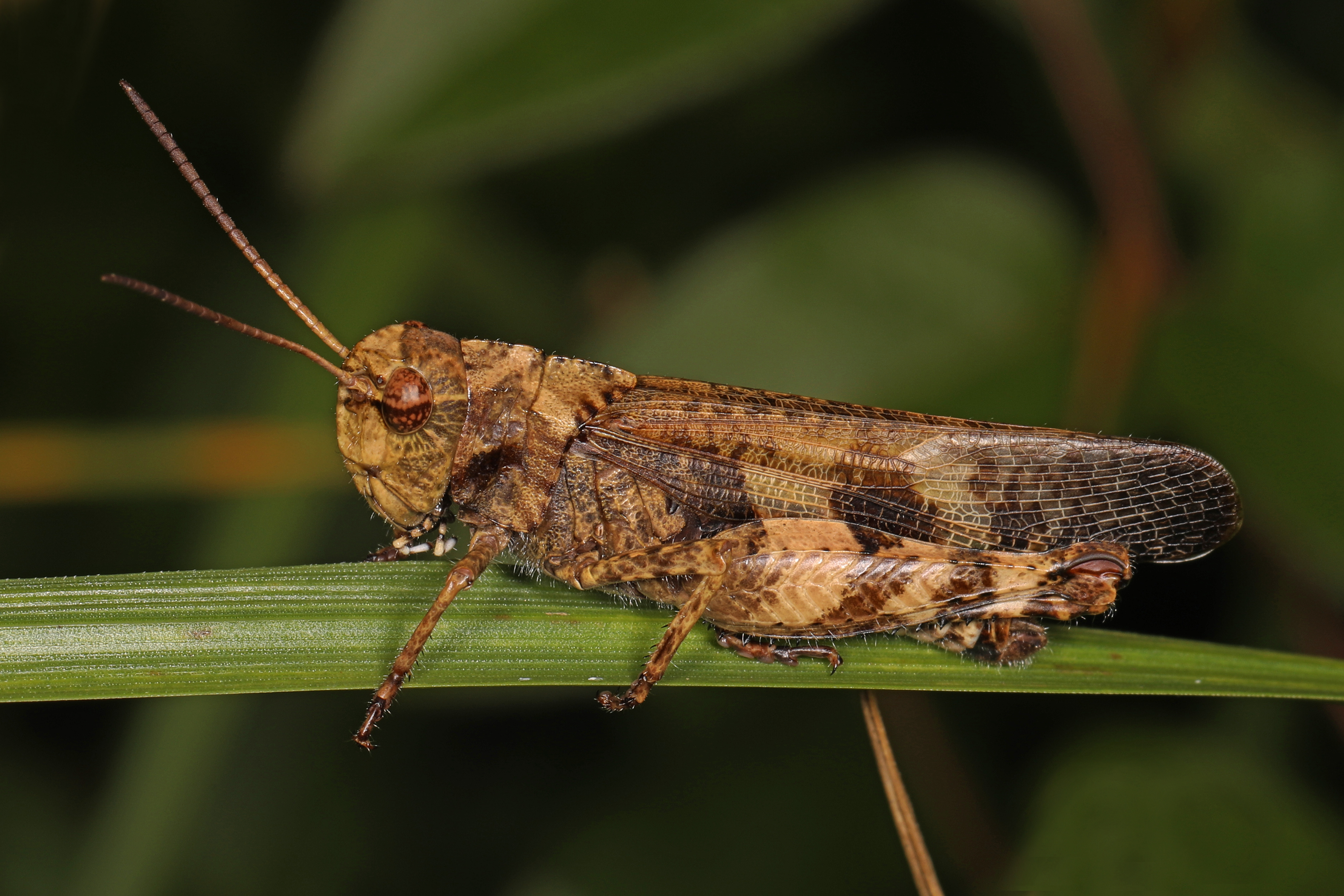

Scientific classification
- Kingdom: Animalia
- Phylum: Arthropoda
- Clade: Pancrustacea
- Class: Insecta
- Order: Orthoptera
- Suborder: Caelifera
- Family: Acrididae
- Tribe: Chortophagini
- Genus: Encoptolophus
- Species: E. sordidus

Binomial name
- Encoptolophus sordidus (Burmeister, 1838)

= Encoptolophus sordidus =

Species of grasshopper

Encoptolophus sordidus, known generally as clouded grasshopper, is a species of band-winged grasshopper in the family Acrididae. Other common names include the dusky grasshopper and dusky locust. It is found in North America.
