= Elizabeth S. Hartwell =

American conservationist

- Born: Elizabeth van Laer Speer; December 1, 1924; Danville, Virginia, USA
- Died: December 14, 2000 (aged 76); Alexandria, Virginia, USA
- Occupation: Conservationist
- Known for: Elizabeth Hartwell Mason Neck National Wildlife Refuge

Elizabeth van Laer Speer Hartwell (December 1, 1924 – December 14, 2000) was an American conservationist based in Virginia. The Elizabeth Hartwell Mason Neck National Wildlife Refuge is named in her memory.

== Early life ==
Elizabeth van Laer Speer was born in Danville, Virginia, the daughter of John Emory Speer and Elizabeth H. van Laer Speer. She attended Mary Washington College (now the University of Mary Washington).

== Career ==
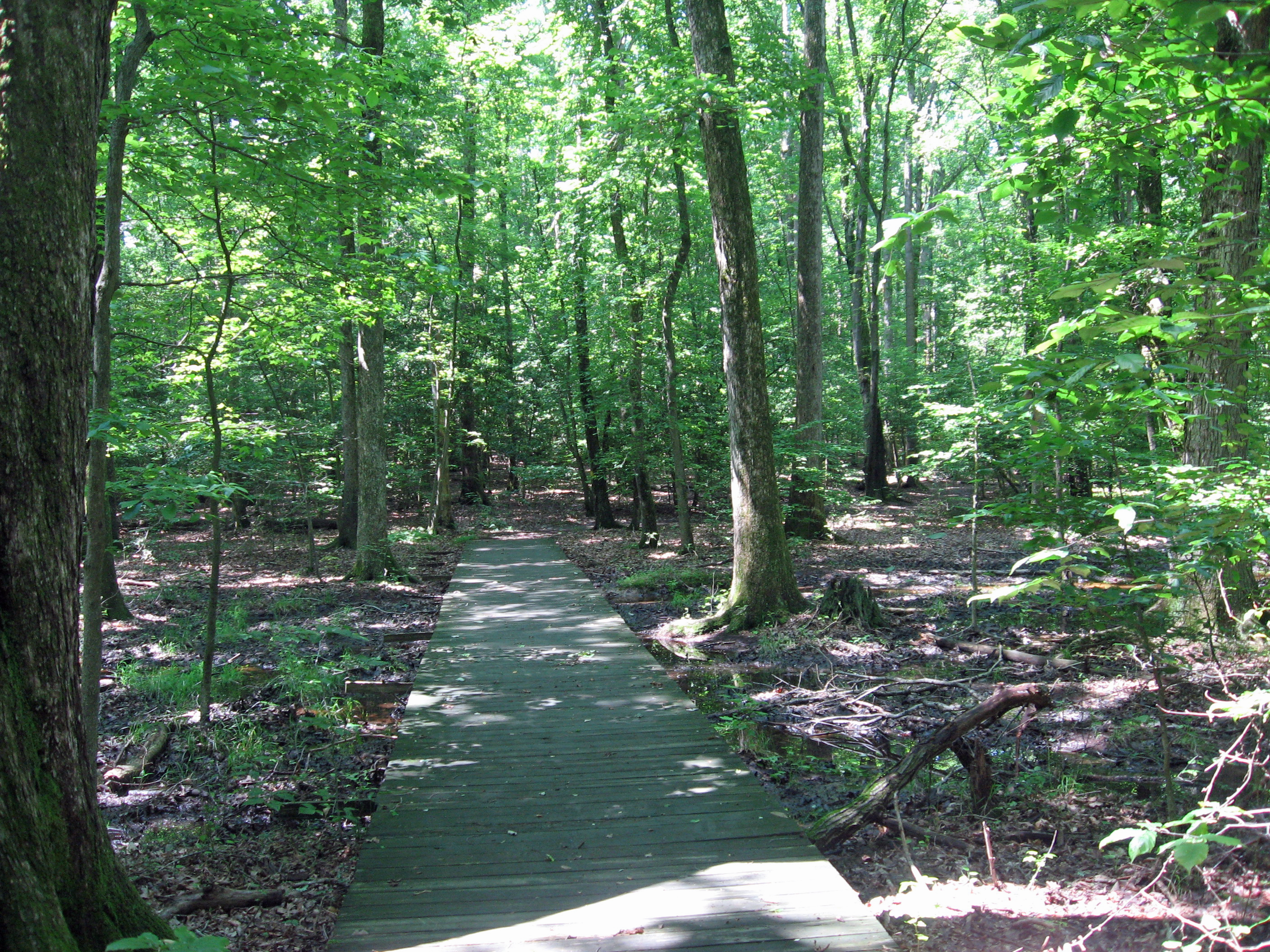
A boardwark in Elizabeth Hartwell Mason Neck National Wildlife Refuge.

Speer worked as a typist in Washington, D.C. during World War II. Beginning in 1965, while living in Mason Neck, Hartwell campaigned against several large-scale development and other intrusive land use plans, working to preserve the natural environment of the peninsula, to protect bird habitats and ultimately to establish the Mason Neck National Wildlife Refuge, Mason Neck State Park, and Pohick Bay Regional Park. She attended zoning board meetings, gave speeches, conducted boat tours, organized phone and mail campaigns, and made a film to promote her cause. She served on the Northern Virginia Potomac River Basin Commission, the Fairfax County Wetlands Board and the Virginia Board of Agriculture, and held leadership positions with the Northern Virginia Regional Park Authority, Friends of Mason Neck, the Conservation Council of Virginia, and the Citizens Council for a Clean Potomac.

Hartwell was named Fairfax County Citizen of the Year by the Washington Star in 1971. In 1976, she was named Wildlife Conservationist of the Year by the Virginia Wildlife Federation. She wrote History and Occoquan Regional Park (1987).

== Personal life ==
Elizabeth Speer married engineer and businessman Stephen Hartwell in 1946, and lived in Mason Neck, Virginia. They had two sons, Stephen and Robert, before they divorced in 1973. She died in 2000, aged 76 years, in Alexandria, Virginia. Mason Neck National Wildlife Refuge was renamed for Hartwell by an act of Congress in 2006. The Potomac Foundation has an Elizabeth S. Hartwell Environmental Education Fund.
