= Elizabeth Hartwell Mason Neck National Wildlife Refuge =

United States National Wildlife Refuge in Virginia

- IUCN category IV (habitat/species management area)
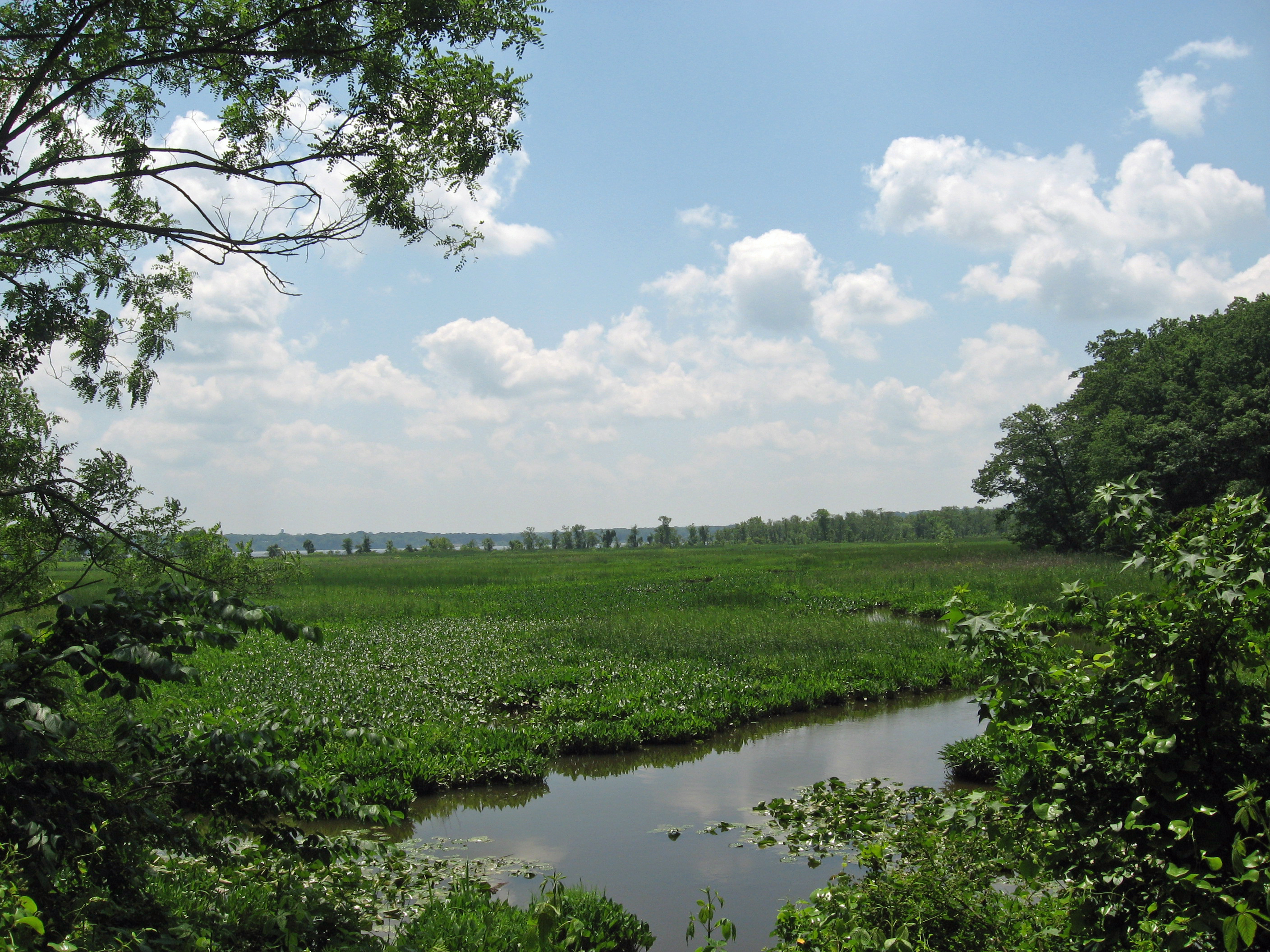
- Mason Neck National Wildlife Refuge

- Location within Virginia Location within the United States
- Location: Fairfax County, Virginia, United States
- Nearest city: Woodbridge, Virginia
- Coordinates: 38°38′27″N 77°09′12″W
- Area: 2,277 acres (9.21 km^{2})
- Established: 1969
- Governing body: U.S. Fish and Wildlife Service
- Website: Elizabeth Hartwell Mason Neck National Wildlife Refuge

Elizabeth Hartwell Mason Neck National Wildlife Refuge is a National Wildlife Refuge of the United States located in Virginia. It is part of the Potomac River National Wildlife Refuge Complex. It is on Mason Neck, a peninsula in the Potomac River that forms part of the shoreline of Belmont Bay. The refuge is adjacent to Mason Neck State Park.

Established in 1969 and managed by the United States Fish and Wildlife Service, it was the first federal refuge created specifically for the protection of the bald eagle. It is 2,277 acres (9.21 km^{2}) in size, with 4.4 miles (7.1 km) of shoreline. It is covered with oak and hickory forest and it includes the largest freshwater marsh in northern Virginia.

Since its founding, the refuge has been renamed for Elizabeth S. Hartwell, a local activist sometimes named the "Eagle Lady" who fought to keep Mason Neck free of development. A handicapped accessible paved trail in the marsh is named to honor longtime Virginia state senator Joseph V. Gartlan Jr.

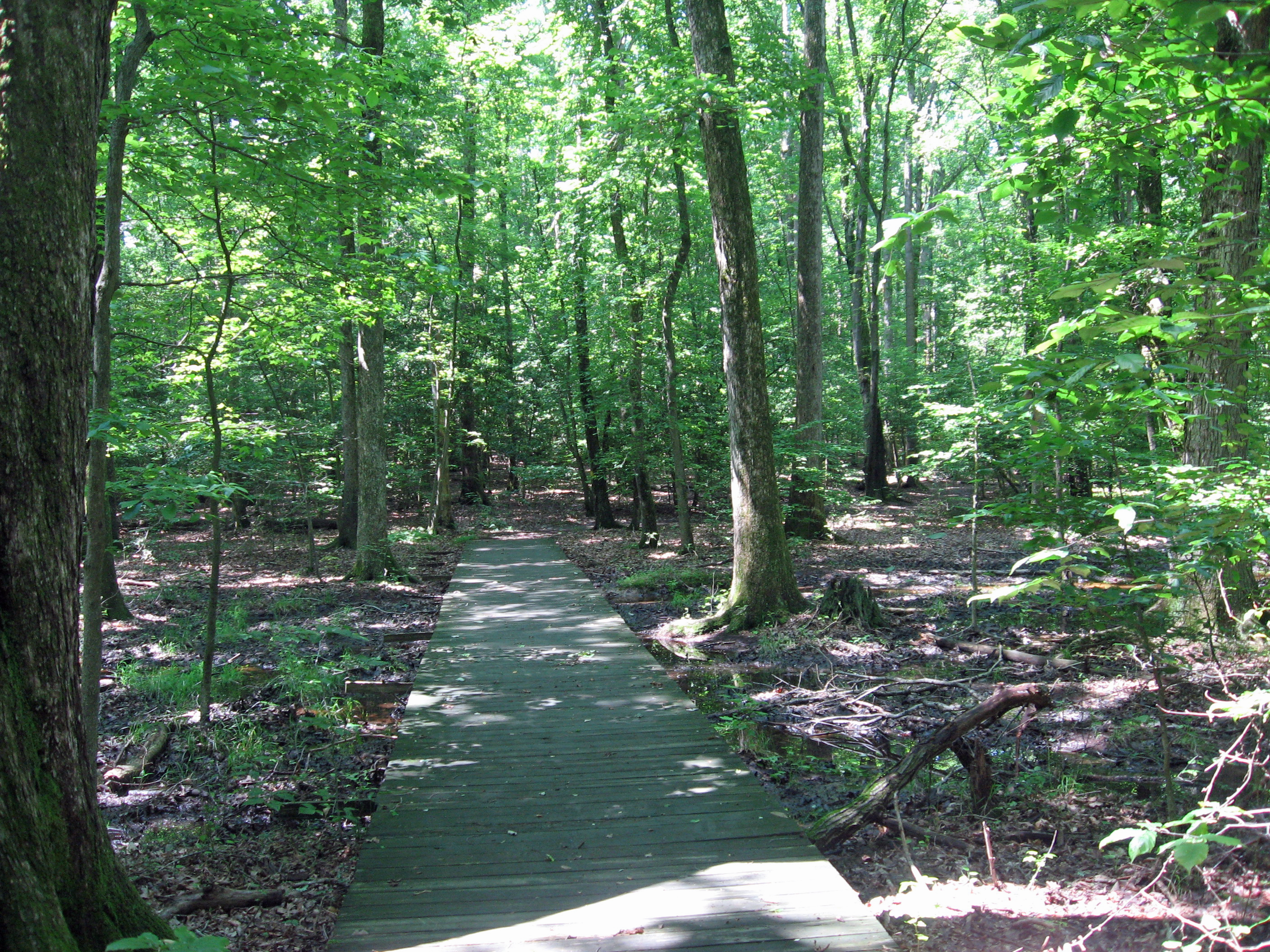
Boardwalk in Mason Neck
