= Encoptolophus pallidus =

Scientific classification
- Kingdom: Animalia
- Phylum: Arthropoda
- Clade: Pancrustacea
- Class: Insecta
- Order: Orthoptera
- Suborder: Caelifera
- Family: Acrididae
- Genus: Encoptolophus
- Species: E. pallidus

Binomial name
- Encoptolophus pallidus Bruner, 1893

Species of grasshopper

Encoptolophus pallidus, known generally as the pale clouded grasshopper or southwestern clouded grasshopper, is a species of band-winged grasshopper in the family Acrididae. It is found in North America.
