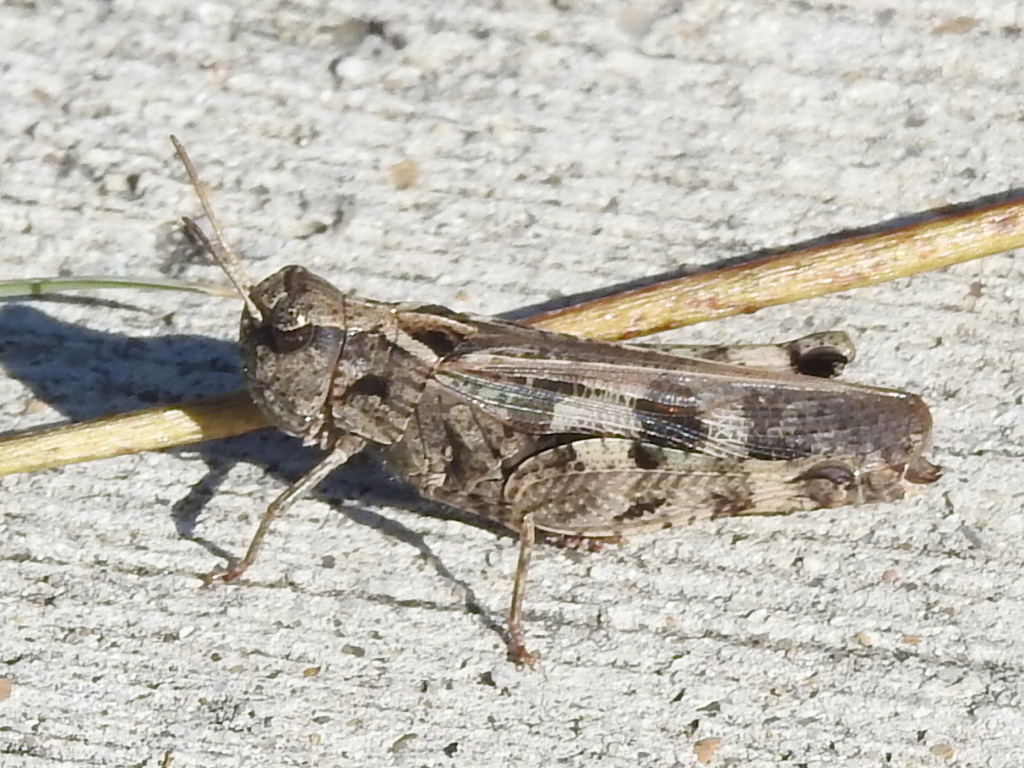
- Encoptolophus costalis, Texas

Scientific classification
- Kingdom: Animalia
- Phylum: Arthropoda
- Clade: Pancrustacea
- Class: Insecta
- Order: Orthoptera
- Suborder: Caelifera
- Family: Acrididae
- Subfamily: Oedipodinae
- Tribe: Chortophagini
- Genus: Encoptolophus
- Species: E. costalis

Binomial name
- Encoptolophus costalis (Scudder, 1863)

= Encoptolophus costalis =

Species of grasshopper

Encoptolophus costalis, known generally as the western clouded grasshopper or dusky grasshopper, is a species of band-winged grasshopper in the family Acrididae. It is found in Central America and North America.
