= Encoptolophus subgracilis =

Scientific classification
- Kingdom: Animalia
- Phylum: Arthropoda
- Clade: Pancrustacea
- Class: Insecta
- Order: Orthoptera
- Suborder: Caelifera
- Family: Acrididae
- Genus: Encoptolophus
- Species: E. subgracilis

Binomial name
- Encoptolophus subgracilis Caudell, 1903

Species of grasshopper

Encoptolophus subgracilis, the southwestern dusky grasshopper, is a species of band-winged grasshopper in the family Acrididae. It is found in North America.
