= Taft Archeological Site No. 029-5411 =

Archaeological site in Virginia, United States

- U.S. National Register of Historic Places
- Virginia Landmarks Register
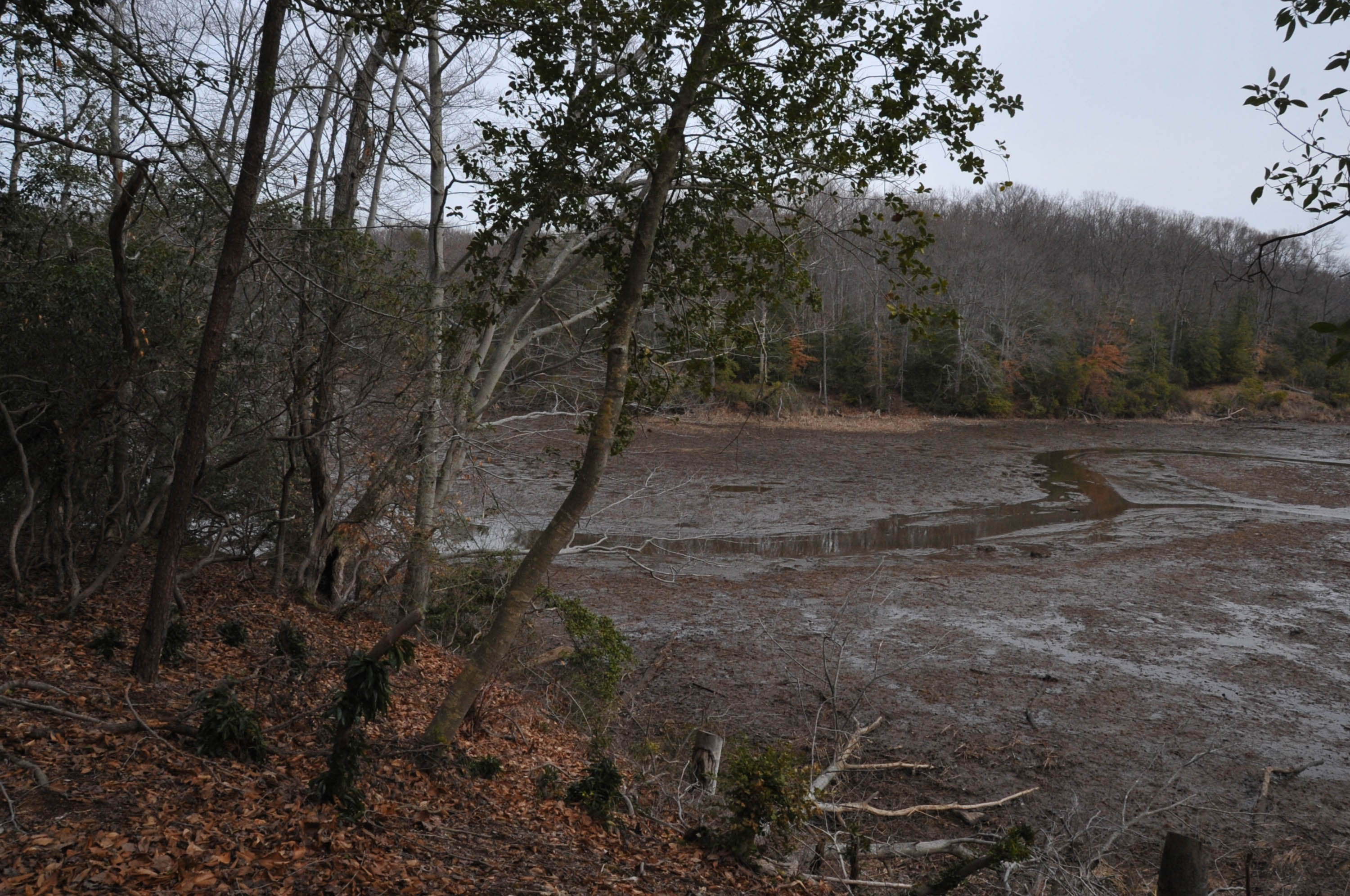
- In Mason Neck State Park

- Location within Northern Virginia Location within Virginia Location within the United States
- Location: 7301 High Point Road, Lorton, Virginia
- Coordinates: 38°38′55″N 77°11′40″W
- Area: 0.7 acres (0.28 ha)
- NRHP reference No.: 04000859
- VLR No.: 029-5411

Significant dates
- Added to NRHP: August 11, 2004
- Designated VLR: June 17, 1998

Taft Archeological Site No. 029-5411 is a historic archaeological site located at Lorton, Fairfax County, Virginia. The site includes a multi-component, stratified, upland, prehistoric and possibly proto-historic (Dogue), American Indian camp covering a 50x80-meter area and dating to between ca. 2000 B.C. (based on Savannah River point) and A.D. 1560. The site was excavated in three stages in May through August 1987. The site is located in Mason Neck State Park.

It was listed on the National Register of Historic Places in 2004.
