= Mason Neck State Park =

State park in Virginia, US

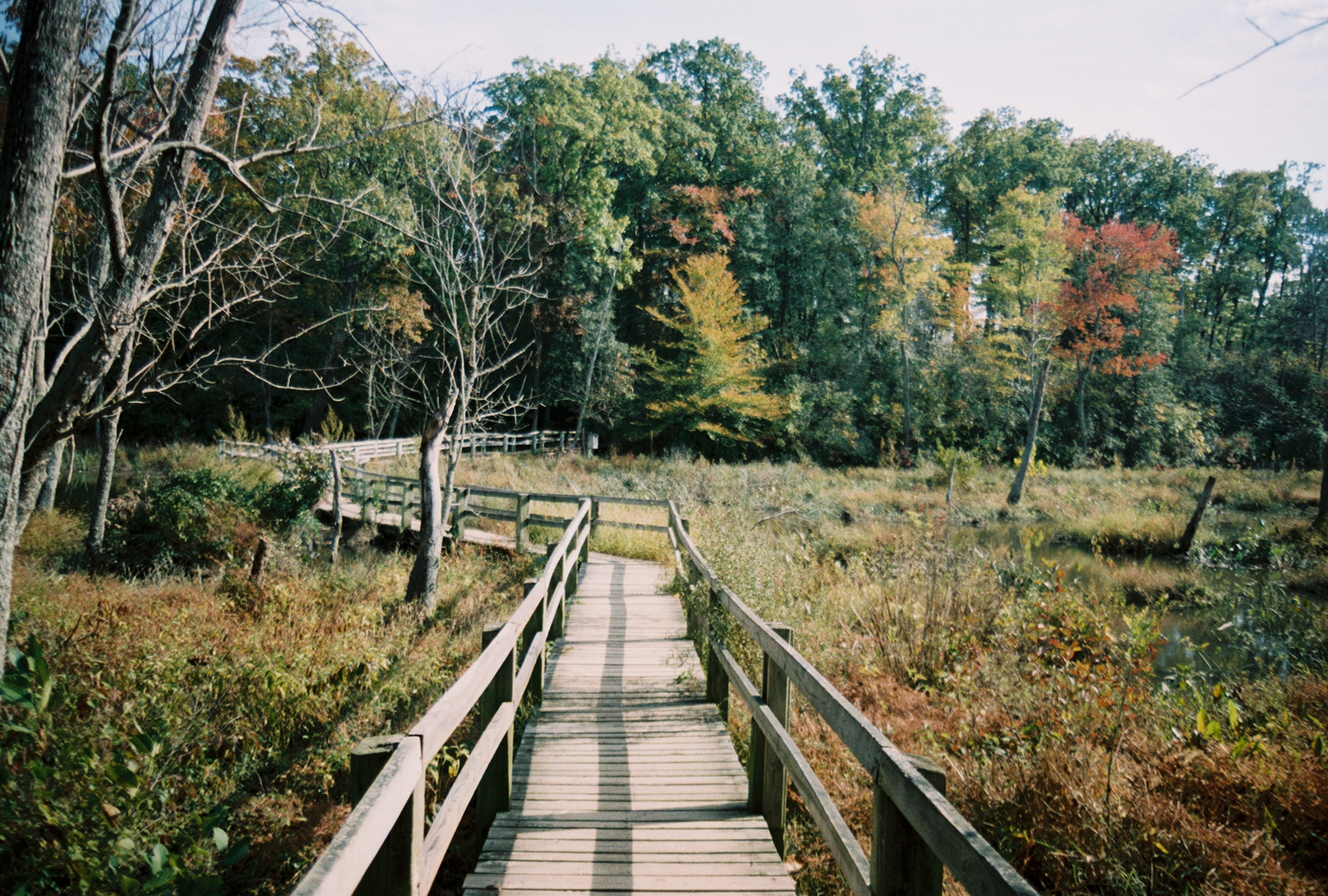
- Boardwalk in Mason Neck State Park

- Location within Virginia Location within the United States
- Location: 7301 High Point Rd.
- Nearest city: Lorton, Virginia
- Coordinates: 38°39′16″N 77°11′3″W
- Area: 1,814 acres (7.34 km^{2})
- Established: 1985
- Governing body: Virginia Department of Conservation and Recreation

Mason Neck State Park is located in Fairfax County, Virginia. The park is on a peninsula formed by Pohick Bay on the north, Belmont Bay on the south and the Potomac River to the east, which was once known as "Dogue Neck" but now as "Mason Neck". The park adjoins the Elizabeth Hartwell Mason Neck National Wildlife Refuge and encompasses 1,814 acres (7.34 km^{2}). It is home to bald eagles, great blue herons, ospreys, and many other types of wildlife. The park also contains white-tailed deer and many species of lichen.

Mason Neck State Park is one of the best locations to view bald eagles in northern Virginia. Sightings are most common in the mornings and evenings.

The park is day-use only. Park hours are 8 a.m. to dusk. The park administration office is open weekdays from 8 a.m. to 3 p.m., and its visitor center from 9a.m. until 4:30p.m. weekdays and 9a.m. until 7p.m. on weekends. Both are closed on state holidays.

Two archeological sites within the park (but not marked on maps, perhaps because relic gathering within Virginia state parks is illegal) are on the state and National Register of Historic Places, and archeological remains have been identified at approximately thirty other sites within the park. The Taft archaeological site which contains items used by Dogue peoples was listed in 2004. The friendly Dogue people were nearly wiped out in the 17th century, in a key predecessor event to Bacon's Rebellion. The Lexington site, indicating a plantation subdivided from nearby Gunston Hall (on the other side of the peninsula, since founding father George Mason owned virtually all the peninsula, as did his father of the same name and son who operated that plantation using enslaved labor, hence the colloquial name), was listed in 2013. In addition, it is on the Star Spangled Banner National Historic Trail based on a naval battery and fighting nearby during the War of 1812.

A plaque outside the visitor center acknowledges Elizabeth Hartwell, whose advocacy for eagle protection helped create the park. She and several other people who advocated founding the park, including Virginia legislators William Durland and Clive L. DuVal II, are mentioned in a plaque by the flagpole in front of the visitor center.

== See also ==
- List of Virginia state parks
