= Richard Barnes Mason =

American military officer (1797–1850)

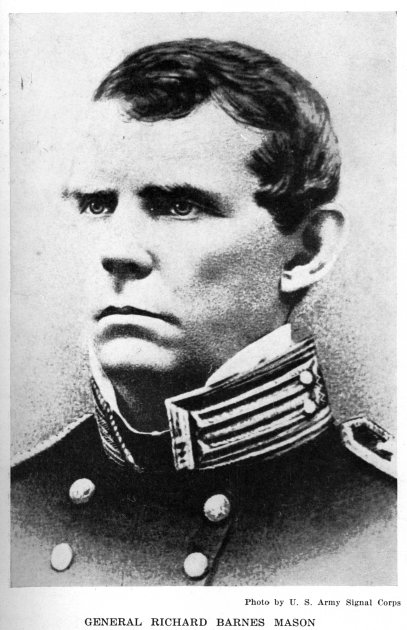

5th Military Governor of California
- In office May 31, 1847 – April 13, 1849
- Preceded by: Stephen W. Kearny
- Succeeded by: Persifor Frazer Smith

Personal details
- Born: January 16, 1797 Lexington Plantation, Fairfax County, Virginia, U.S.
- Died: July 25, 1850 (aged 53) Jefferson Barracks, St Louis, Missouri, U.S.
- Resting place: Bellefontaine Cemetery
- Party: Democratic
- Spouse: Elizabeth Margaret Hunter (m. 1836)
- Profession: Soldier

Military service
- Allegiance: United States of America
- Branch/service: Cavalry
- Years of service: 1817–1850
- Rank: Colonel; Bvt. Brigadier General
- Unit: 8th U.S. Infantry; 1st U.S. Infantry
- Commands: Fort Gibson; 1st U.S. Dragoons; Jefferson Barracks
- Battles/wars: Black Hawk War; Second Seminole War; Mexican–American War

Richard Barnes Mason (January 16, 1797 – July 25, 1850) was an American military officer who was a career officer in the United States Army and the fifth military governor of California before it became a state. He came from a politically prominent American family and was a descendant of George Mason, a framer of the U.S. Constitution and father of the Bill of Rights.

Gen. Mason is especially important to the history of California, because as military governor of the occupied territory, he wrote the official report that led to the California gold rush.

Mason was "an aristocratic Virginian, a large portly man, six feet in height. He possessed all the peculiarities of a Southerner, accentuated," but he was known to have confined Jefferson Davis to quarters, who was under his command. A Lt. James Abert described him so, "It would be presumption in me to speak of so accomplished and well known an officer; but I cannot refrain from expressing my grateful sense of the kindness and hospitality with which we were received and treated by himself and his amiable lady, and indeed, by all the officers and ladies attached to the command."

== Early life ==
"Richard Barnes Mason, born in Fairfax County, Virginia, January 16, 1797, was the son of George Mason and Elizabeth Mary Ann Barnes Hooe, who were married April 22, 1784." His grandfather was famous founder George Mason. Richard Barnes Mason inherited a considerable estate, consisting mostly of land and enslaved men and women. Upon the death of his father, he and his siblings frequently squabbled over the division of the estate and the profits made by selling enslaved men and women. In 1823, Richard complained to his brother George that "I wish you would make some exertion to pay me for Tom Clarke [an enslaved man whom the family sold]. It is now six years since you sold him, and I have not yet received a cent. It is not right that, you should, who inherited half my father's fortune, withhold from me, who got none, what is so justly my due." Like so many other enslavers and prominent Virginians, Mason's wealth was heavily dependent upon the labor and bodies of the people he held as slaves.

== Military career ==
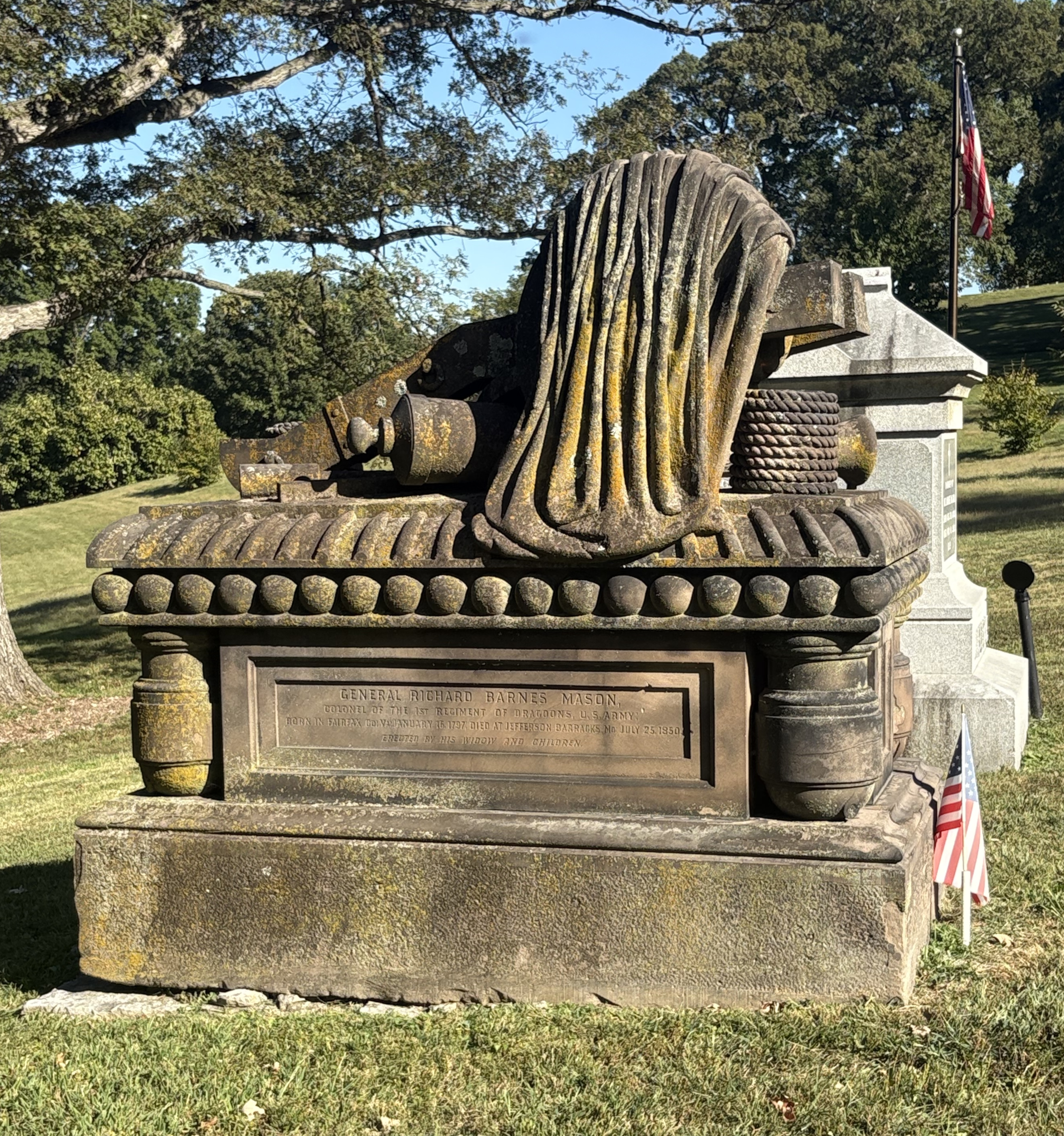
Mason's grave at Bellefontaine Cemetery

Mason was commissioned in the Army in 1817, to be stationed in the Mississippi Valley and the Great Lakes area. While serving, he frequently speculated in land and wrote to his family and friends with tips on where they could make the greatest fortune by speculating in land and relocating with the enslaved men and women who they claimed ownership of. In 1820, he told his brother to "advise Gerard by all means to sell his landed property and move with his Negroes to KY or the Missouri." Barnes frequently complained to his siblings about his low pay, and implored them to send his money or his "negroes" so that he could work them in Kentucky.

He served in the 1st U.S. Infantry during the Black Hawk War. In 1833, he transferred to the 1st U.S. Dragoons as its first Major. He was promoted to lieutenant colonel in 1836. During the Mexican–American War, he served in New Mexico Territory and California, rising to the rank of colonel in 1846.

Following the war, he was appointed military governor of California, serving from May 31, 1847, until April 13, 1849. When gold was discovered at Sutter's Mill, Mason made a report of the finding to President James K. Polk. That official description of the massive gold discovery is credited with sparking the California Gold Rush, resulting in the settlement of the land.

Mason died in 1850 at Jefferson Barracks in St. Louis, Missouri, and was buried at Bellefontaine Cemetery.

In the US Federal Census of 1850 for Jefferson Barracks, St. Louis County, Missouri, dated August 18, 1850, the following annotation is located at the bottom of the third page: "Brig Genl Mason died at Jefferson Barracks July 1849 of Cholera." However, The St. Louis Intelligencer reported the General's death on Saturday, July 27, 1850, (p. 3, cols. 1, 4.)

== Marriage and children ==
Mason married Elizabeth Margaret Hunter on January 28, 1836. Richard and Elizabeth had three daughters:

- Emma Twiggs Mason Wheaton (October 17, 1836 – February 16, 1864)
- Elizabeth Mary Ann Sally Mason (August 20, 1838 – November 19, 1912)
- Alice Graham Mason (c. 1843 – February 10, 1847)

== Honors ==
In 1882, the Post at Point San Jose in San Francisco, California, was renamed Fort Mason in his honor, and served as an Army base for more than 100 years.

== Ancestry ==
Ancestors of Richard Barnes Mason

8. George Mason III
4. George Mason IV
9. Ann Stevens Thomson
2. George Mason V
10. William Eilbeck
5. Ann Eilbeck
11. Sarah Edgar
1. Richard Barnes Mason
12. John Hooe
6. Gerard Hooe
13. Anne Fowke Alexander
3. Elizabeth Mary Anne Barnes Hooe
14. Richard Barnes
7. Sarah Barnes
15. Penelope Manly
