= George Mason V =

American businessman (1753-–1796)

- Born: April 30, 1753; Colony of Virginia, British America
- Died: December 5, 1796 (aged 43); Lexington, Fairfax County, Virginia, U.S.
- Resting place: Gunston Hall, Fairfax County, Virginia, U.S.
- Occupations: planter, businessperson, militia leader
- Spouse: Elizabeth "Betsey" Mary Ann Barnes Hooe
- Children: 6, including George Mason VI and Richard Barnes Mason
- Parent(s): George Mason IV; Ann Eilbeck

George Mason V (April 30, 1753 – December 5, 1796) was an American planter, businessman, and militia officer. Mason was the eldest son of United States patriot, statesman, and delegate from Virginia to the U.S. Constitutional Convention, George Mason IV and his wife Ann Eilbeck. He received his early education from private tutors at Gunston Hall and was given Lexington plantation on Mason's Neck by his father in 1774. In 1775, he named his plantation to commemorate the Battle of Lexington in Massachusetts.

Mason joined the Fairfax County Independent Militia in 1775 and was elected Ensign. He developed a rheumatic disorder that plagued him for the remainder of his life. In 1776, he commanded a militia company sent to Hampton, Virginia to protect the coast from Lord Dunmore's assaults, but was forced to quit the military on account of his increasingly poor health. He travelled to France between 1779 and 1783 for business purposes and to improve his health. At his father's request, George Washington wrote Mason letters of introduction to the Gilbert du Motier, Marquis de Lafayette and Benjamin Franklin in Paris. While in France, he settled in Nantes, where he became involved in the tobacco trade and occasionally arranged for shipments of goods to his father.

Upon the death of his father in 1792, Mason inherited the entirety of Mason's Neck. He died four years later at Lexington, on December 5, 1796, after suffering from chronic ill health for his entire adult life. He was interred in the Mason family graveyard at Gunston Hall. In 1803, his widow Betsey married George Graham, a nephew of George Mason's second wife, Sarah Brent, who had lived at Gunston Hall and been educated with this Mason's two youngest brothers before completing his education at Columbia University and becoming a lawyer and government official as well as planter.

His will divided Mason's Neck into two approximately equal tracts along a north–south axis from Causeway Point to Martin Cockburn's south boundary line. His eldest son George Mason VI received the eastern tract with the ownership privilege of either Lexington or Gunston Hall, of which he chose the latter. Another of his sons, William Eilbeck Mason, received the western half of the Neck.

== Family ==
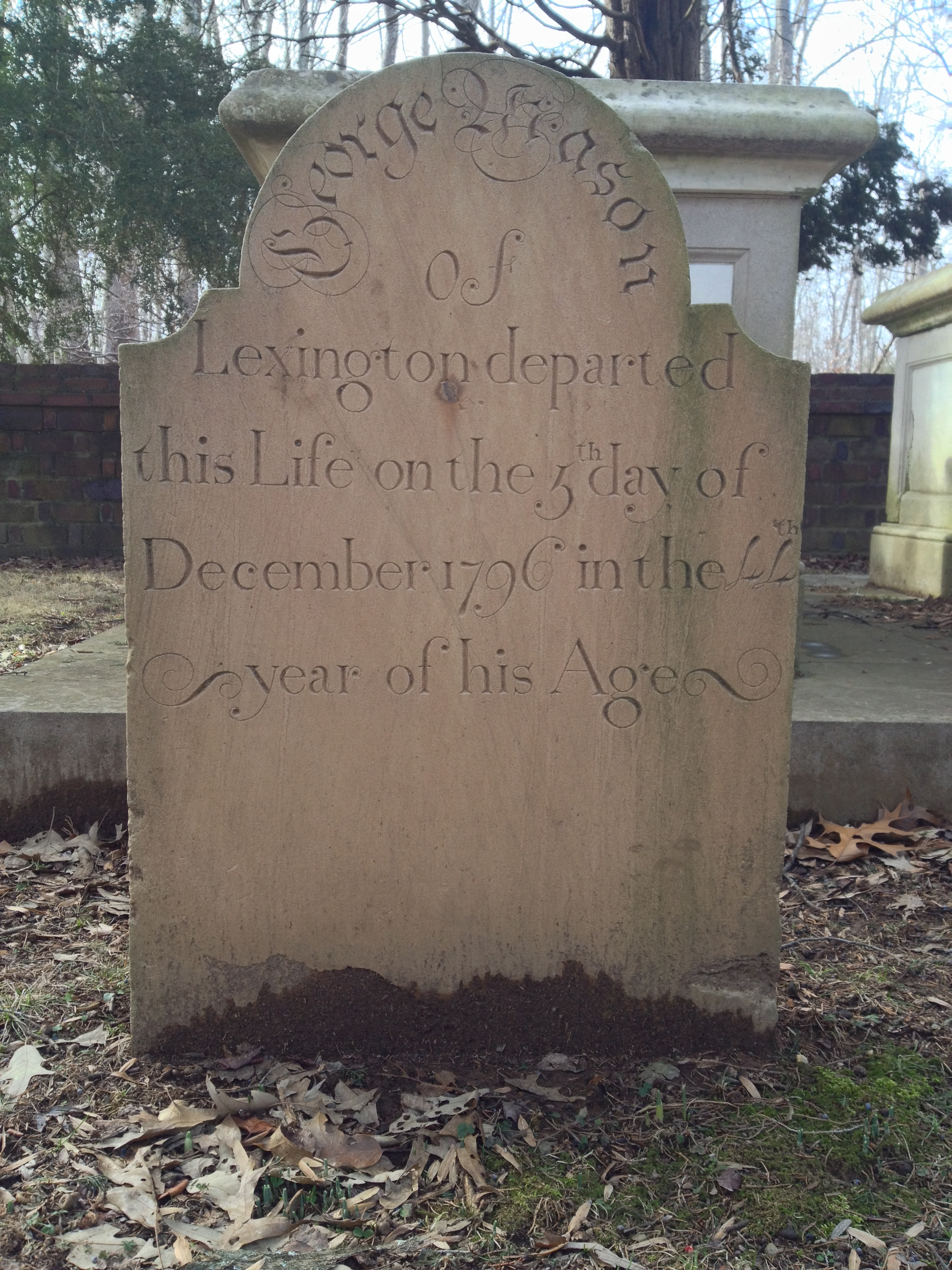
Gravestone at Mason's interment site in the Mason Family Cemetery at Gunston Hall.

Mason married Elizabeth "Betsey" Mary Ann Barnes Hooe, daughter of Gerard Hooe and Sarah Barnes of Barnesfield, King George County, on April 22, 1784. They had six children:

- Elizabeth Mary Ann Barnes Mason Hooe (March 9, 1785 – March 25, 1827)
- George Mason VI (August 11, 1786 – August 21, 1834)
- William Eilbeck Mason (February 3, 1788 – November 22, 1820)
- Ann Eilbeck Mason Grymes (April 1, 1791 – November 5, 1864)
- Sarah Barnes Hooe Mason Stith (May 27, 1794 – September 11, 1877)
- Richard Barnes Mason (January 16, 1797 – July 26, 1850)

He was a son of George Mason (1725–1792); nephew of Thomson Mason (1733–1785); first cousin of Stevens Thomson Mason (1760–1803), John Thomson Mason (1765–1824), and William Temple Thomson Mason (1782–1862); father of George Mason VI (1786–1834) and Richard Barnes Mason (1797–1850); uncle of Thomson Francis Mason (1785–1838) and James Murray Mason (1798–1871); first cousin once removed of Armistead Thomson Mason (1787–1819), John Thomson Mason (1787–1850), and John Thomson Mason Jr. (1815–1873); and first cousin twice removed of Stevens Thomson Mason (1811–1843).
