= Mason Neck, Virginia =

Peninsula and community in Virginia, US

- Census-designated place
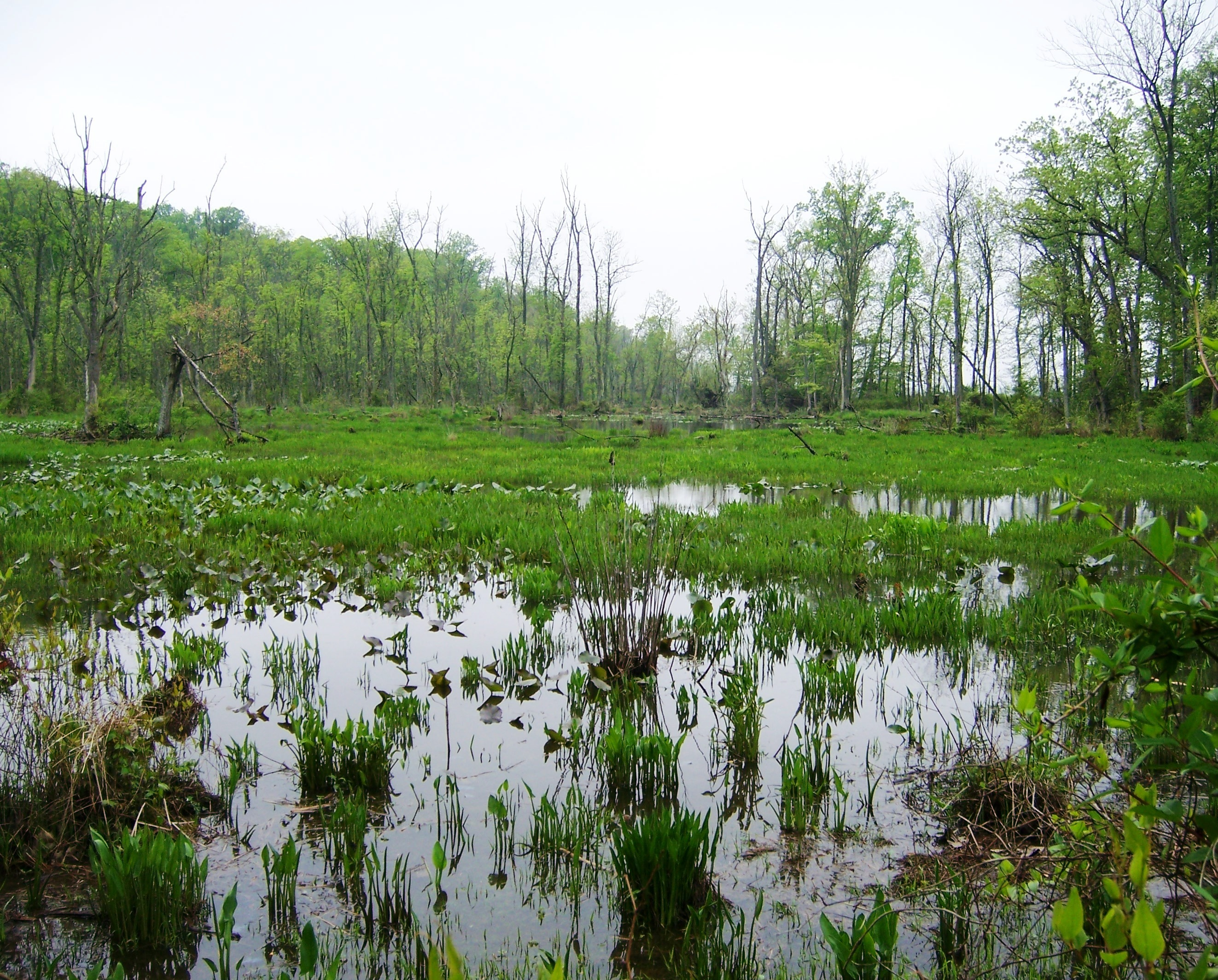
- Wetlands in Mason Neck State Park

- Location within Northern Virginia Location within Virginia Location within the United States
- Coordinates: 38°39′23″N 77°10′45″W
- Country: United States
- State: Virginia
- County: Fairfax

Area
  - Total: 20.0 sq mi (51.9 km^{2})
  - Land: 13.9 sq mi (35.9 km^{2})
  - Water: 6.2 sq mi (16.0 km^{2})
- Elevation: 20 ft (6.1 m)

Population (2010)
  - Total: 2,005
  - Density: 145/sq mi (55.9/km^{2})
- Time zone: UTC−5 (Eastern (EST))
  - Summer (DST): UTC−4 (EDT)
- FIPS code: 51-49998
- GNIS feature ID: 2584877

Mason Neck is a peninsula jutting into the Potomac River that is a census-designated place in Fairfax County, Virginia, United States, southwest of Washington, D.C. It is surrounded by Belmont Bay to the west, the Potomac River to the south and east, Gunston Cove to the northeast, and Pohick Bay to the north-northeast. Mason Neck forms the southernmost section of Fairfax County in Northern Virginia. It comprises an area of 20.0 square miles (51.8 km^{2}), two-thirds of which is preserved as parkland by regional, state, and national authorities. As of the 2020 census, Mason Neck had a population of 2,025.

== History ==
The Mason Neck peninsula was inhabited by the Doeg prior to the arrival of European settlers. The recorded history of Mason Neck began around 1755 with the construction of Gunston Hall, the plantation house of George Mason, author of the Virginia Declaration of Rights. Mason Neck is also the location of Pohick Church, frequented by both Mason and George Washington, and Cranford Methodist Church, which was built in 1857 and served as a hospital during the Civil War.

During the 19th and early 20th centuries, much of the land was used for the logging of mature pine and hardwood timber. Over time, pollution and habitat destruction caused a decline in the bald eagle population. By the 1960s, much of the forest had grown back, but residential development as a suburb of Washington posed another threat. In 1969, local residents and conservation groups achieved the establishment of the Elizabeth Hartwell Mason Neck National Wildlife Refuge, with the specific objective of protecting the bald eagle. This, along with Mason Neck State Park and Pohick Bay Regional Park, provides a variety of recreational activities while preserving the land's natural resources.

During the 1980s, the Lynch family traded Fairfax County officials their Mason Neck land holdings in exchange for 900 acres (360 ha) of land near the Lorton Prison. This plot of land became the housing development known as Crosspointe. Many of the suburban subdivisions located around the Lorton Prison are built on land that the Lynch family once owned. The Mason Neck land that was traded to the county later became a state-controlled nature reserve called Meadowood.

== Demographics ==
Historical population
Census	Pop.	Note	%±
2010	2,005		—
2020	2,025		1.0%
U.S. Decennial Census; 2010 2020

Mason Neck was first listed as a census designated place in the 2010 U.S. census.

Mason Neck CDP, Virginia – Racial and ethnic composition Note: the US Census treats Hispanic/Latino as an ethnic category. This table excludes Latinos from the racial categories and assigns them to a separate category. Hispanics/Latinos may be of any race.
Race / Ethnicity (NH = Non-Hispanic)	Pop 2010	Pop 2020	% 2010	% 2020
White alone (NH)	1,717	1,525	85.64%	75.31%
Black or African American alone (NH)	78	86	3.89%	4.25%
Native American or Alaska Native alone (NH)	3	5	0.15%	0.25%
Asian alone (NH)	58	99	2.89%	4.89%
Native Hawaiian or Pacific Islander alone (NH)	2	1	0.10%	0.05%
Other race alone (NH)	0	16	0.00%	0.79%
Mixed race or Multiracial (NH)	34	128	1.70%	6.32%
Hispanic or Latino (any race)	113	165	5.64%	8.15%
Total	2,005	2,025	100.00%	100.00%

== Wildlife ==
In addition to Bald Eagles, Mason Neck is home to over 211 bird species, over 200 plant species, over 31 mammal species, and 40 reptiles and amphibians species. Birds include great blue herons, Canada geese, ospreys, wood ducks, teal, owls, and woodpeckers. Whitetail deer are common, along with beavers, muskrats, groundhogs, and foxes. A diverse population of frogs and toads can be heard on summer nights. Eastern box turtles, eastern snapping turtles, wood turtles, and spotted turtles can all be found around ponds, streams, and marshes, as well as snakes, such as the northern copperhead and the northern black racer.
