= Gunston Hall =

Historic house in Virginia, United States

- U.S. National Register of Historic Places
- U.S. National Historic Landmark
- Virginia Landmarks Register
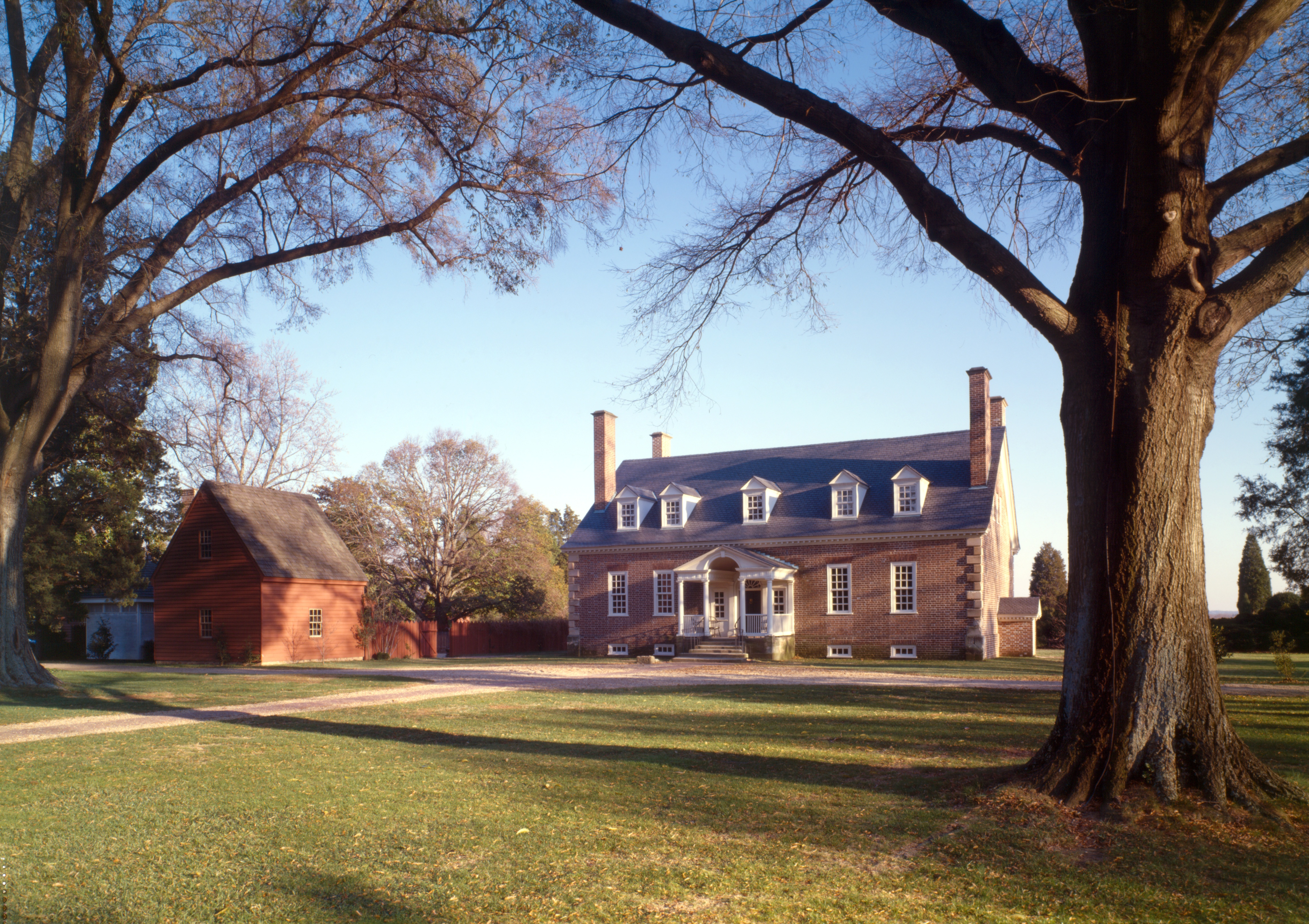
- View of Gunston Hall from the northwest

- Location within Northern Virginia Location within Virginia Location within the United States
- Interactive map showing the location of Gunston Hall
- Nearest city: Lorton, Virginia
- Coordinates: 38°39′50″N 77°9′37″W
- Area: 555.7 acres (224.9 ha)
- Built: 1759
- Architects: George Mason; William Buckland; William Bernard Sears
- Architectural style: Georgian
- Website: gunstonhall.org
- NRHP reference No.: 66000832
- VLR No.: 029-0050

Significant dates
- Added to NRHP: October 15, 1966
- Designated NHL: December 19, 1960
- Designated VLR: September 9, 1969, June 27, 2007

Gunston Hall is an 18th-century Georgian mansion near the Potomac River in Mason Neck, Virginia, United States. Built between 1755 and 1759 by George Mason, a Founding Father, to be the main residence and headquarters of a 5,500-acre (22 km^{2}) slave plantation. The home is located not far from George Washington's home, Mount Vernon.

The interior of the house and its design was mostly the work of William Buckland, a carpenter/joiner and indentured servant from England. Buckland later went on to design several notable buildings in Virginia and Maryland. Both he and William Bernard Sears, another indentured servant, are believed to have created the ornate woodwork and interior carving. Gunston's interior design combines elements of rococo, chinoiserie, and Gothic styles, an unusual contrast to the tendency for simple decoration in Virginia at this time. Although chinoiserie was popular in Britain, Gunston Hall is the only house known to have had this decoration in colonial America.

In 1792, Thomas Jefferson visited Gunston Hall for the last time, attending George Mason's death bed. After Mason's death, the house remained in use as a private residence for many years. In 1868, it was purchased by noted abolitionist and Civil War Colonel Edward Daniels. It is now a museum owned by the Commonwealth of Virginia and open to the public. The National Society of The Colonial Dames of America (NSCDA) operates the museum as a joint effort with the Commonwealth of Virginia led by a Board of Regents selected by the NSCDA. The home and grounds were designated a National Historic Landmark in 1960 for their association with Mason.

== History ==
=== Naming ===
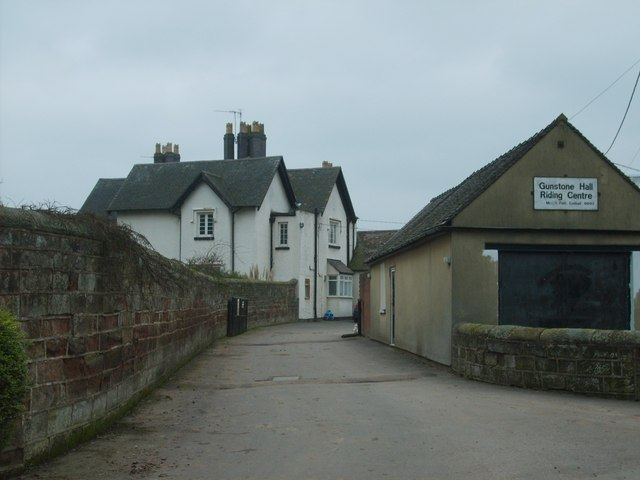
Original Gunston Hall, South Staffordshire, England

The Masons came from Gunstone in South Staffordshire and like many others in that area supported the Crown during the 1642-1651 Wars of the Three Kingdoms. After the Royalist defeat at Worcester in 1651, Philip Mason I emigrated to Virginia, along with his cousin Gerard Fowke, whose family home was Gunstone Hall and which gave its name to George Mason's building. One of his distant relatives was Lieutenant General Thomas Fowke (1690–1765), who fought at the Battle of Prestonpans during the 1745 Jacobite Rising.

=== Construction ===
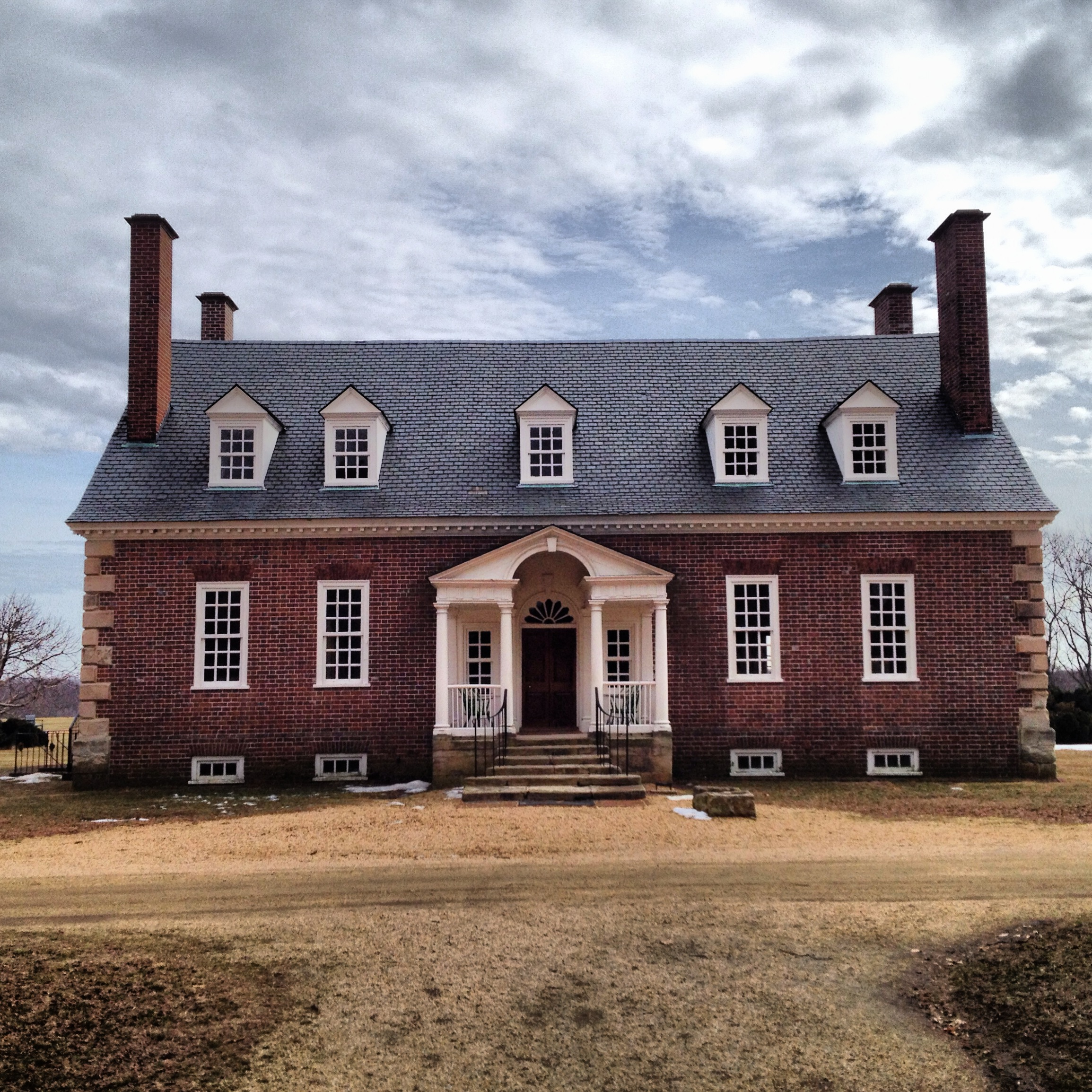
Gunston Hall, February 2014, from the road

William Buckland signed an indenture with Thomson Mason, George Mason's brother, on 4 August 1755, four months after he finished as an apprentice from April 1748 to April 1755. In exchange for free passage to Virginia, room and board, and a yearly salary of twenty pounds sterling, Buckland agreed to act as a carpenter and joiner for the Masons for four years.

In November, when Buckland arrived, the exterior walls of Gunston Hall were probably complete. Buckland probably did design the portico overlooking the garden, in addition to much of the interior. The various carvings in the mansion were probably the combined work of William Buckland and William Bernard Sears. Buckland most likely provided designs for the carvings, but Sears most likely carved the wood. Buckland and Sears probably worked on much of the original furniture together. At the time, it was not uncommon for English architects to design furniture as well as buildings.

=== Later history ===
The mansion stayed in the Mason family until 1867. From 1868 to 1891, it was owned by Edward Daniels, a Virginia newspaper publisher and Reconstruction Era politician, who was a former Union cavalry officer and ardent abolitionist. In 1912, it was bought by retired Marshall Field & Company executive, Louis Hertle, whose second wife, Eleanor Daughaday, was a member of The National Society of The Colonial Dames of America. They set about restoring the mansion to its original plan and hosted many prominent guests. In 1949, Hertle in his will gave the property to the Commonwealth of Virginia as a museum to be run by The National Society of The Colonial Dames of America.

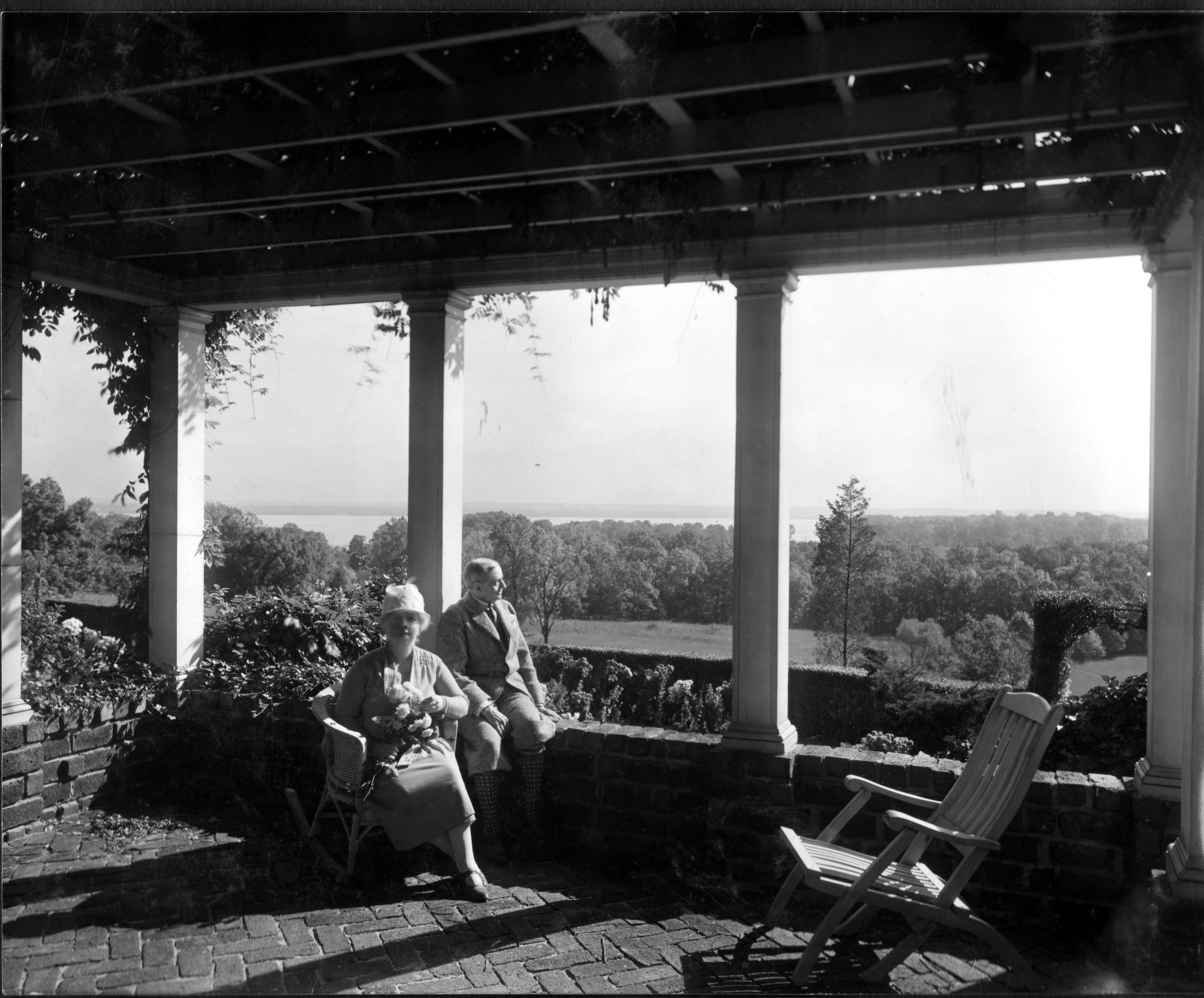
The Hertles at Gunston Hall c. 1925

Pamela Cunningham Copeland, American horticulturist and historic preservationist, made a significant contribution to the restoration of Gunston Hall in her role as first regent of the Board of Regents of Gunston Hall for the National Society Colonial Dames of America. Copeland led successful efforts to restore its historic gardens, acquire period furniture for the main house, and led efforts to reunite Mason family descendants to support the historic site. She was also the coauthor of "The Five George Masons.... Patricians and Planters of Virginia and Maryland" in 1975.

== Architecture ==
=== First floor ===
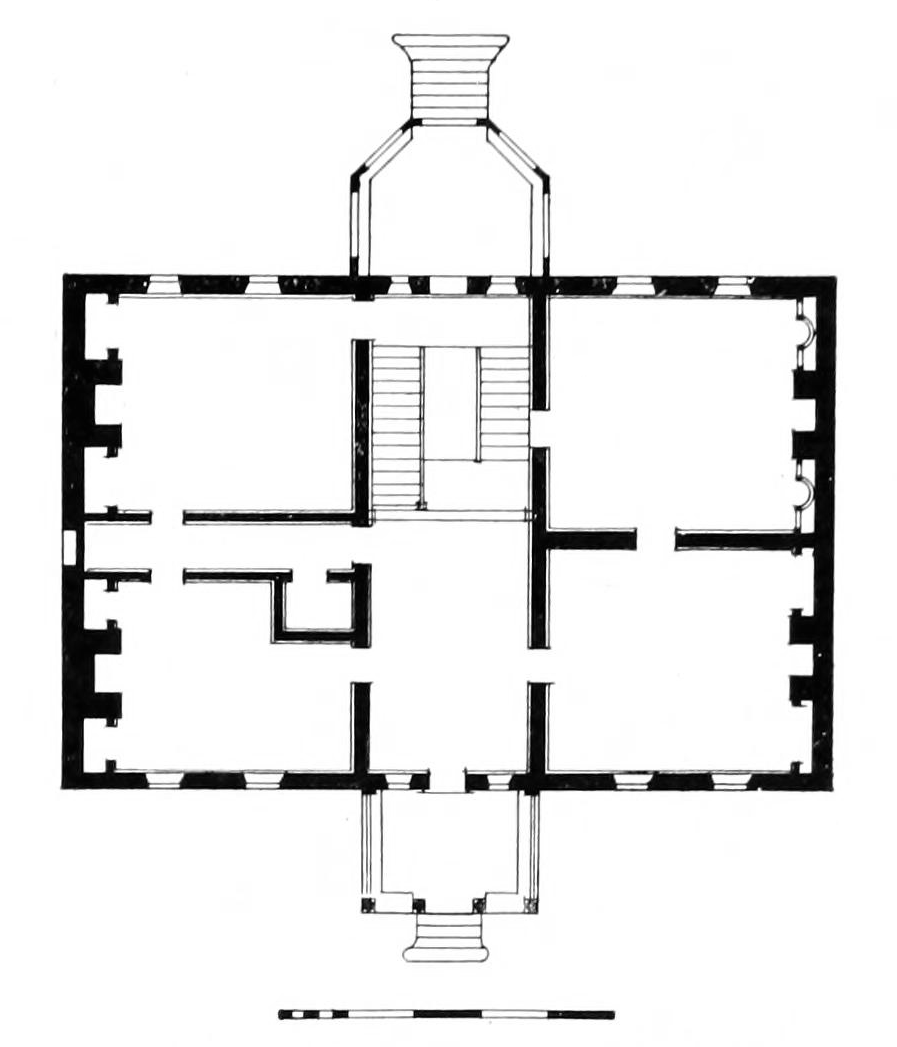
Plan of Gunston Hall as it appeared in the early 20th century, prior to restoration

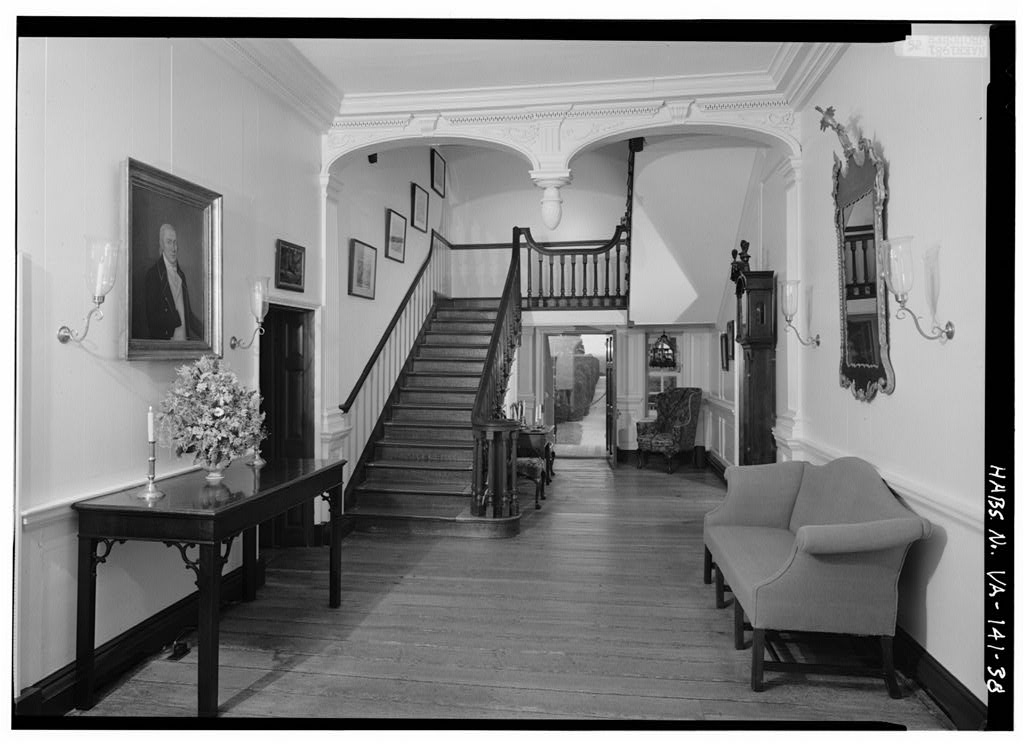
Central passage (1981)

The front of the house faces northwest. The first floor of the house is divided in two by a central passage, leading from a door in the northwest to a door in the southeast, with a staircase running up on the northeast side. On the northeast side of the central passage is the primary chamber (or bedroom) in the front, and the little parlor in the back. Between the primary chamber and the little parlor is a smaller passage, leading to a service staircase and a small, side stairway. The Gunston Hall Plantation official website says that on the southwest side of the house is a parlor in the front and a dining room in the back. However, the Historic American Buildings Survey says that on the southwest side of the house the dining room is in the front and a palladian room is in the back.

The central passage is lined by six symmetrical Doric-style pilasters. A double arch, with a carved pine cone, divides the front of the passage from the back. In the front, there are four doors placed opposite one another, although one is a fake door for symmetry. The front of the hall is covered in wallpaper, while the back has raised painted paneling.

The primary chamber was a private room and was less ornate than the public rooms. Toward the end of Mason's life, it was painted in emerald green, which was considered a desirable color. The windows had pocket shutters, and are believed to be the only windows in the house to have curtains during Mason's lifetime.

The little parlor was private and decorated plainly. The walls were painted a neutral grey. Above the fireplace was a split pediment overmantel (a rectangle, and a partial triangle above that). During Mason's lifetime, the rectangle contained either a painting or a mirror. On either side of the fireplace are deep-shelved beaufats (niches) to store and display the tableware, with doors to secure valuable possessions.

External videos
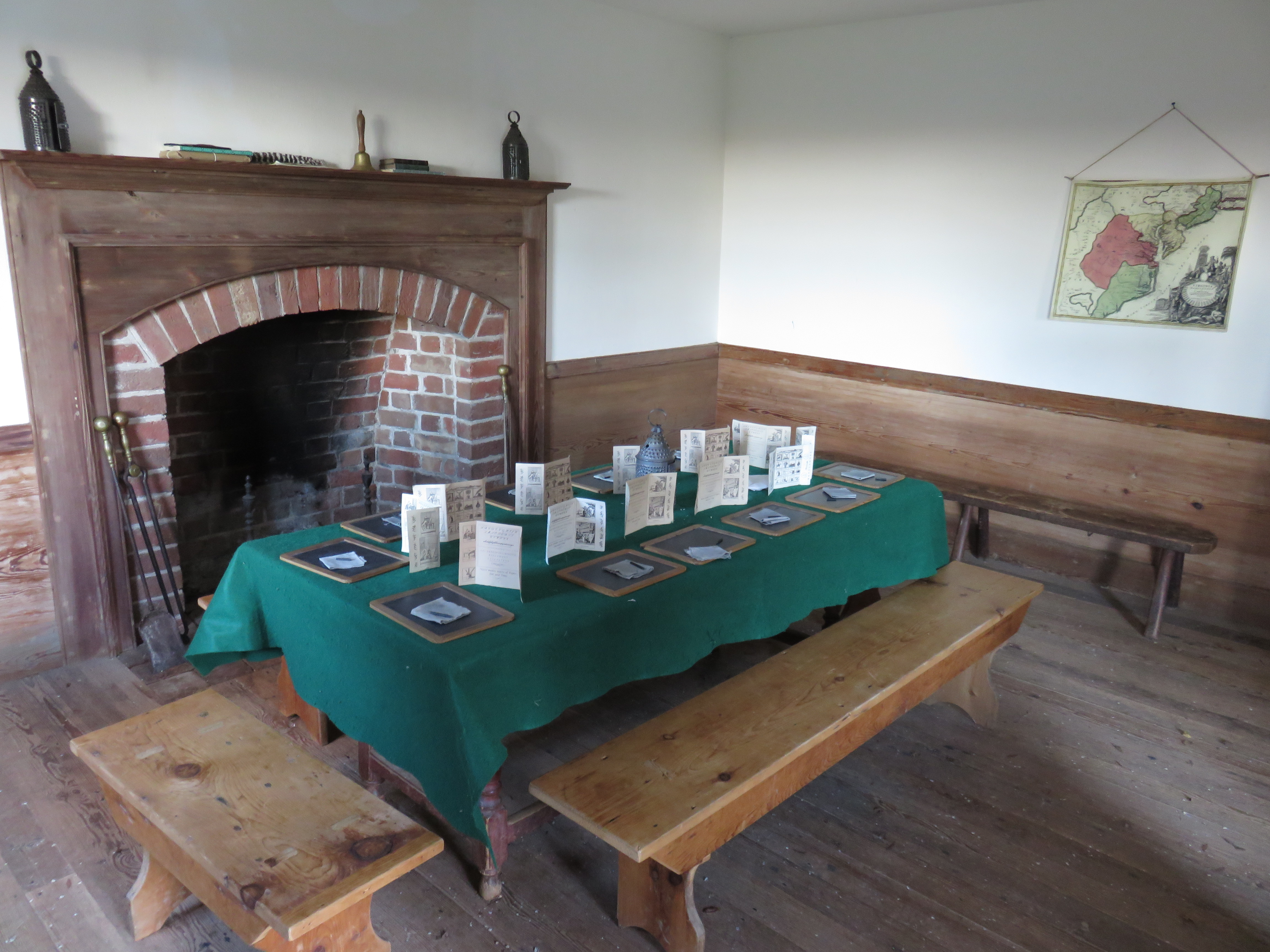
- George Mason's Gunston Hall, C-SPAN
- Gunston Hall Plantation, C-SPAN

The western room (called the parlor or the dining room) was a public, ornately decorated room. The walls are painted a yellow ocher, and the woodwork is Chinese-style. The wall of the fireplace has a mantel decorated with fretwork, pagoda-like scalloped moldings, as well as canopies topped by pine cone finials. Above the doors are similar canopies, which might have displayed Chinese porcelain vases or ceramic figures. The two long windows are topped by scalloped pediments, decorated with fretwork. During Mason's lifetime, three of the walls were probably wallpapered. During the 18th century, chinoese (Chinese-style) design was popular in Great Britain, however the Gunston Hall museum does not know of any other rooms in colonial America with this type of coordinated chinoiserie woodwork.

The southern room (called the dining room or the palladian room), was public, and was the most elaborately decorated in the house. The classical woodwork shows touches of the fashionable rococo design. The fireplace wall has an ornate chimney breast. On either side of the fireplace are beaufats, these ones with shallower shelves than in the little parlour, and no doors. Classical broken pediments top the chimney breast and the beaufats. The floor was made of carefully matched blind-doweled planks, an expensive feature. Egg-and-dart carved patterns surround the black-walnut entry doors. During Mason's lifetime, painted or decorated paper covered the thin pine paneling on the walls. The two windows look out onto Mason's garden.

=== Second floor ===
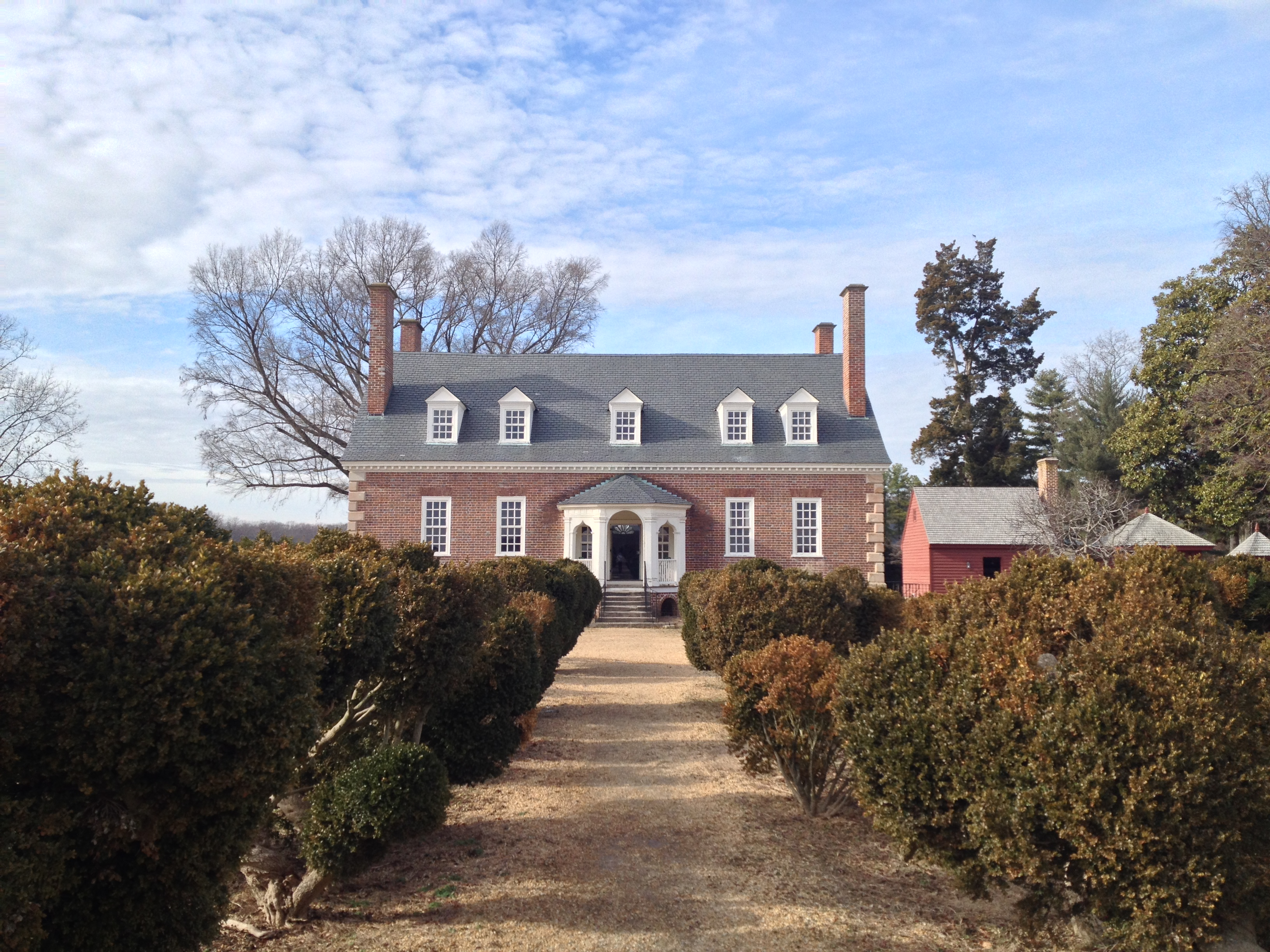
Gunston Hall in 2014, seen from the river side looking through the garden

Unlike other 18th-century houses of Gunston Hall's stature, the layout of the second floor is entirely dissimilar to the floor below. A narrow passage runs sideways through the upper level, leading to seven bedchambers and a storage room. At the top of the main stairway is a tri-part arch with fluted pillars, separating the passageway from a small gallery overlooking the staircase. The smaller service staircase comes up opposite the storage room.

Of the bedchambers, only the four corner rooms have fireplaces. Their fireplaces and surrounds did have some architectural detail. The corner rooms had two or three windows each, while the inner chambers only had one window each. The walls of the corner bedchambers were painted with more expensive shades, such as Prussian blue or verdigris. The attic was accessible through one of the inner bedrooms.

The storage closet, or lumber room, had no exterior window, but instead received light from a window to the stairwell, as there was an exterior window above the staircase landing.

=== Basement ===
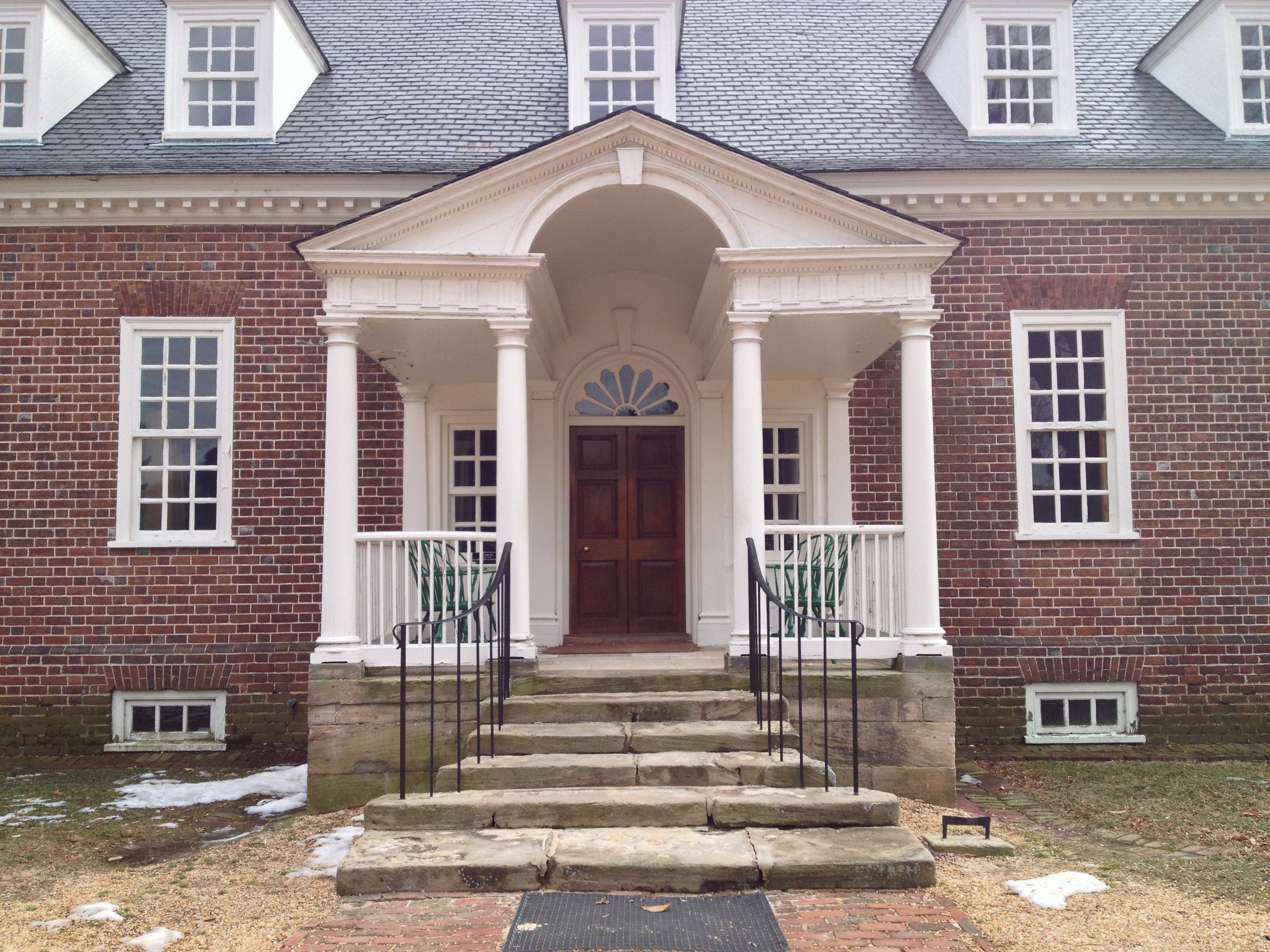
Land front Porch

Gunston Hall has a basement, which has a main passage and four rooms like the floor above it. Three staircases lead down to the basement. The basement contains four brick arched chimney supports, and nine small windows. In 1975, a cast-iron stove was excavated from the basement. The style of the stove suggests it is from the 18th or early 19th century. Around 1986, a "shallow subsurface perimeter drainage system" was built about four feet (1.2 m) away from the foundation walls. This reduced standing water in the basement caused by excess ground moisture.

=== Porches ===
The front porch of Gunston Hall is William Buckland (architect)'s "most individualistic design", according to Great Georgian Houses of America, as copied by the Historic American Buildings Survey. The classical lines of the porch exactly follow those of a Roman medal of the Temple of Tyche in Eumeneia, Asia Minor, only engraved once. It is possible Buckland saw the medal or heard it discussed while apprenticing with his uncle, a bookshop owner. The porch is also quite similar to the porch of Honington Hall, near Oxford. It is possible the Honington Hall porch inspired Buckland.

== Garden and outbuildings ==
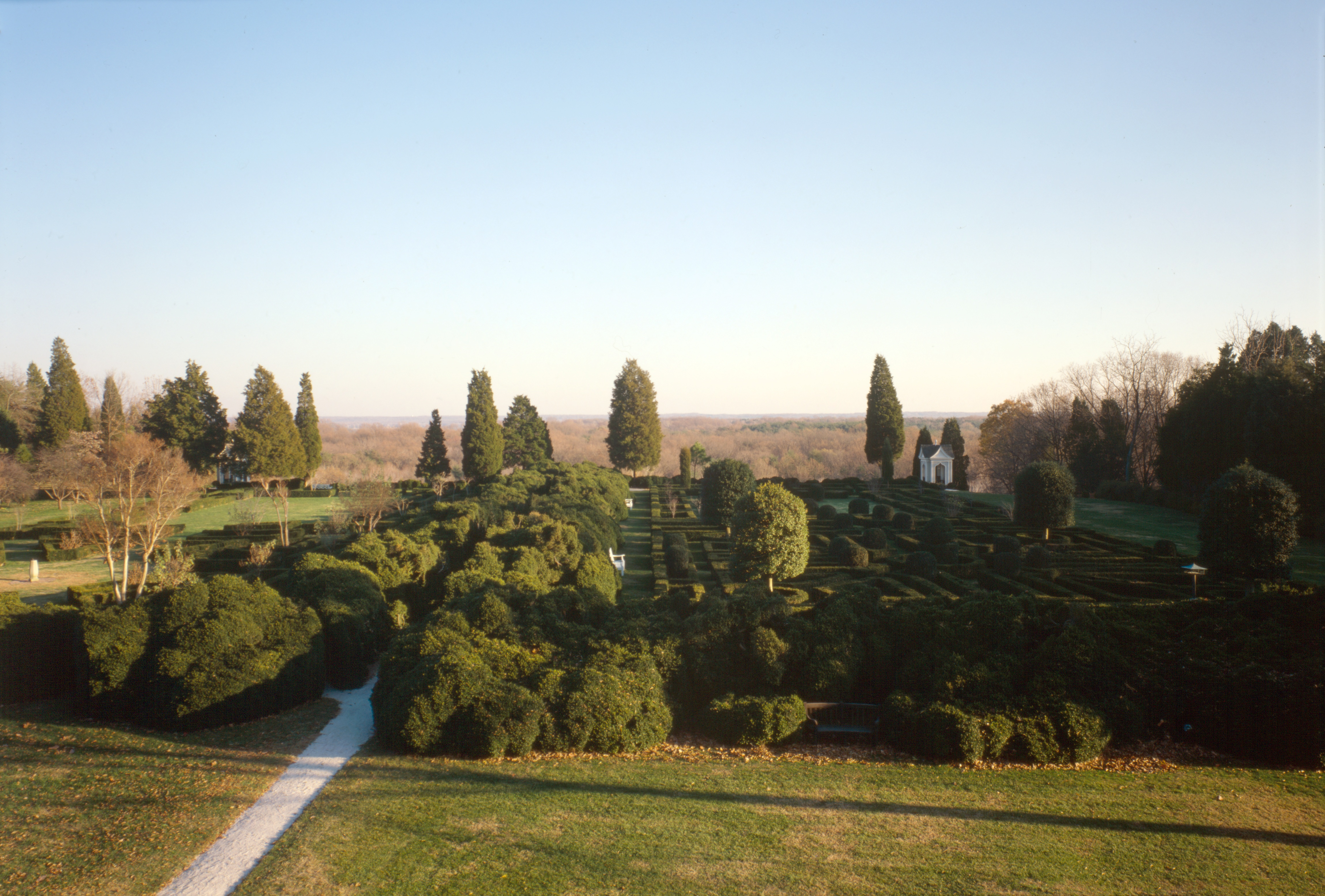
View of garden from Gunston Hall looking southwards from a second floor window

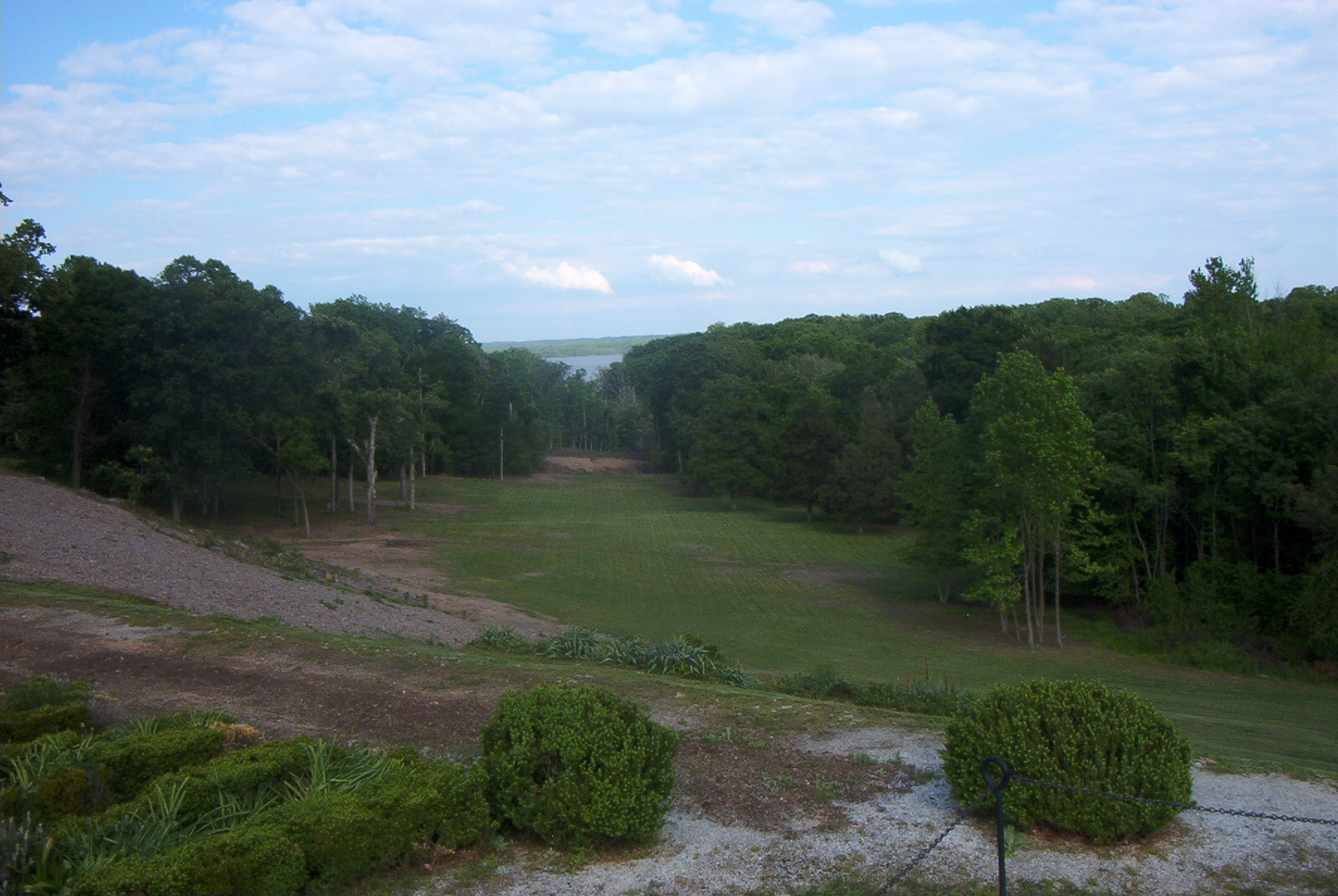
View from the outlook on the southern edge of Gunston Hall's garden, looking out toward the Potomac

The garden is located behind the house, or on the southern side. The garden was grown above a man-made level platform where there used to be a hill, and is exactly one acre (about 4000 sq m) in area. A gravel path runs from the back of the house to the southern edge, and was twelve feet (3.7 m) wide during Mason's time period, the same width as the central passage in the house and the portico. Today, the path is narrower, crowded by boxwoods that are now about 250 years old. The path ends in an overlook extending out from the steep edge of the garden. From here, the Potomac river can be seen. The Gunston Hall museum website says that the view was more impressive during Mason's time, when the trees were cleared. The garden was most likely broken into four rectangles, with additional gravel paths running through and around it. To give the illusion from the house of all rectangles being the same size, the rectangles closer to the house were probably shorter than the rectangles farther away.

The outbuildings at Gunston Hall are reconstructed. They include a kitchen, dairy, smokehouse, and laundry. They are believed to represent typical support buildings of an 18th-century plantation household. George Mason owned about 90 enslaved people, but the location of their dwellings is unknown.

== Visitors' center and museum shop ==
The visitors' center shows an 11-minute film, "George Mason and the Bill of Rights."

The museum shop sells souvenirs such as books, gift items, soap, food, and toys.

== Other Mason plantations ==
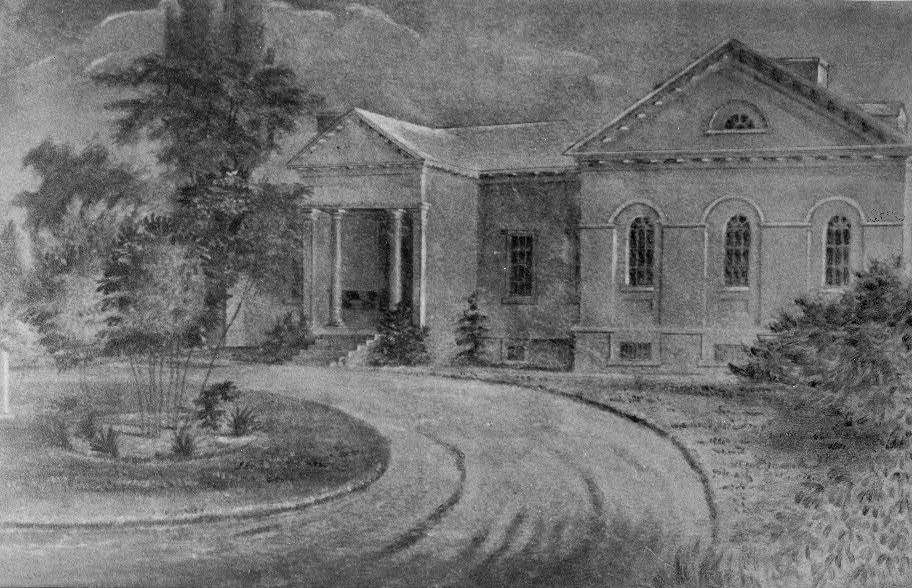
Photograph of a drawing of the Mason mansion on Analostan Island

George Mason's other plantations included Hollin Hall, Woodbridge, Lexington, and Mason's Island. His son, John Mason, lived in Clermont for part of his life. The Gunston Hall plantation was essentially a small village, home to more than a hundred people.

George Mason gave Hollin Hall to his third son, Thomson Mason, through deeds of gift in 1781 and 1786. The land, as given, totaled 676 acres (2.74 km^{2}). Hollin Hall is about three miles (4.8 km) southwest of Alexandria. Late in the 18th century, it was near George Washington's Mount Vernon. Thomson Mason was the first member of the Mason family to live here. Before, the land was rented out to tenants. Woodbridge Plantation used to be on the Occoquan River across from Colchester, Virginia. There was a ferry there. George Mason willed the land to Thomas Mason, his youngest son, in 1792.

Lexington Plantation was originally part of the Gunston Hall Plantation land. Lexington was given to George Mason's first son, George Mason V. The mansion of Lexington Plantation was probably not built until after George Mason V returned from a trip to Europe in 1783.

George Mason III bought Barbadoes Island (now Theodore Roosevelt Island) from Francis Hammersly in 1717, and the island came to be known as Mason's Island. George Mason gave the island to his fourth son John Mason in 1792. Since John Mason always referred to the island as Analostan Island it came to be known by that name. During the 1790s, John ordered a summer home built there. After financial troubles, the bank foreclosed the island and John's Georgetown property in 1833. John Mason then moved to Clermont, a 320-acre (1.3 km^{2}) property he had recently acquired, where he spent the rest of his life.

== Legacy ==
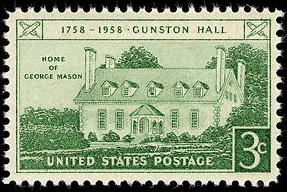
Gunston Hall, 1958 issue

Gunston Hall, home of George Mason, was commemorated on a 3-cent stamp for the 200th anniversary on June 12, 1958. The view shows the riverfront side of the classic mid-Georgian brick home. George Mason was author of the Virginia Declaration of Rights, which served as the basis of the first ten amendments to the Federal Constitution.

Gunston Hall was the namesake of USS Gunston Hall (LSD-5) launched in 1943, and USS Gunston Hall (LSD-44) launched in 1987. Gunston Hall is also the namesake for Gunston Elementary School, in Lorton, Virginia, Gunston Middle School in Arlington, Virginia, as well as "Gunston," a former athletic mascot for George Mason University.

In Biltmore Forest, North Carolina, George Mason's great-great-grandson William Mason built New Gunston Hall, also called Franklin Hall, in 1923. It is based on the original Gunston Hall.

== See also ==
- List of National Historic Landmarks in Virginia
- National Register of Historic Places listings in Fairfax County, Virginia
