= Mason family =

American political family

Mason
- Current region: Eastern United States
- Origin: Pershore, Worcestershire, England
- Members: George Mason IV; Stevens Thomson Mason (1760–1803); Armistead Thomson Mason; James Murray Mason; John Thomson Mason Jr. Stevens Thomson Mason (1811–1843)
- Connected families: Fairfax family Fitzhugh family Lee family Mercer family Randolph family Taliaferro family Spannagel family Street family
- Estate: Gunston Hall

The Mason family of Virginia is a historically significant American political family of English origin, whose prominent members are known for their accomplishments in politics, business, and the military. The progenitor of the Mason family, George Mason I (1629–1686), arrived at Norfolk, Virginia on the ship Assurance in 1652. Mason was a Cavalier member of the Parliament of England during the reign of Charles I of England. George Mason I's great-grandson was George Mason IV (1725–1792), an American patriot, statesman, and delegate from Virginia to the U.S. Constitutional Convention. Along with James Madison, George Mason IV is known as the "Father of the Bill of Rights." For these reasons, Mason is considered one of the "Founding Fathers" of the United States and raised the Mason family to national political prominence.

George Mason II (1660–1716) and his son George Mason III (1690–1735) both served as a member of the House of Burgesses, Stafford County sheriff, Stafford County county lieutenant, Stafford County militia colonel, planters, and businesspersons. George Mason III's son and George Mason IV's younger brother, Thomson Mason (1733–1785), was a patriot, statesman, and delegate from Virginia to the U.S. Constitutional Convention. Thomson Mason's son, Stevens Thomson Mason (1760–1803) served as a colonel in the Continental Army during the American Revolutionary War, a member of the Virginia state legislature, and as a Republican U.S. Senator from Virginia (1794–1803). Another of Thomson Mason's sons, John Thomson Mason (1765–1824) was a jurist and Attorney General of Maryland in 1806. Thomson Mason's grandson John Thomson Mason (1787–1850) was a lawyer, United States marshal, Secretary of Michigan Territory from 1830 through 1831, land agent, and an important figure in the Texas Revolution. His son Stevens Thomson Mason (1811–1843), was also territorial governor of the Michigan Territory, and later governor of the state of Michigan. He was first appointed acting Territorial Secretary at the age of 19, then became acting Territorial Governor in 1834 at the age of 22. George Mason IV's grandson James Murray Mason (1798–1871) was a United States representative and United States senator from Virginia and represented the Confederate States of America as appointed commissioner of the Confederacy to Great Britain and France between 1861 and 1865 during the American Civil War.

== Notable members of the Mason family ==
- George Mason I (1629–1686)
  - George Mason II (1660–1716)
    - George Mason III (1690–1735)
      - George Mason IV (1725–1792)
        - George Mason V (1753–1796)
          - George Mason VI (1786–1834)
            - George Thomson Mason (1818–1846)
          - Richard Barnes Mason (1797–1850)
        - William Mason (1757–1818)
        - Thomson Mason (1759–1820)
          - Thomson Francis Mason (1785–1838)
            - Arthur Pendleton Mason (1835–1893)
          - Richard Chichester Mason (1793–1869)
            - Beverley Randolph Mason (1834–1910)
              - Richard Nelson Mason (1876–1940)
            - John Stevens Mason (1839–1918)
            - Landon Randolph Mason (1841–1923)
              - Lucy Randolph Mason (1882–1959)
            - William Pinckney Mason (1843–1923)
        - John Mason (1766–1849)
          - John Mason Jr. (1797–1859)
            - Alexander Macomb Mason (1841–1897)
          - James Murray Mason (1798–1871)
          - Anne Maria Mason Lee (1811–1898)
            - Fitzhugh Lee (1835–1905)
        - Thomas Mason (1770–1800)
      - Thomson Mason (1733–1785)
        - Stevens Thomson Mason (1760–1803)
          - John Thomson Mason (1787–1850)
            - Stevens Thomson Mason (1811–1843)
            - Emily Virginia Mason (1815–1909)
            - Catherine Armistead Mason Rowland (1818–1884)
              - Kate Mason Rowland (1840–1916)
          - Armistead Thomson Mason (1787–1819)
        - John Thomson Mason (1765–1824)
          - John Thomson Mason Jr. (1815–1873)
        - William Temple Thomson Mason (1782–1862)
