= William Temple Thomson Mason =

American businessman (1782–1862)

Member of the Virginia House of Delegates from the Loudoun district
- In office December 3, 1842 – December 1, 1844 Serving with Humphrey B. Powell, Samuel B.T. Caldwell
- Preceded by: James McIlhaney
- Succeeded by: James McIlhaney

Personal details
- Born: July 24, 1782 Raspberry Plain, Leesburg, Virginia
- Died: 1862 Georgetown, Washington, D.C.
- Resting place: Old Episcopal Churchyard, Leesburg, Virginia
- Spouse: Ann Eliza Carroll
- Relations: nephew of George Mason IV
- Children: 11
- Education: The College of William & Mary
- Occupation: planter, politician

William Temple Thomson Mason (July 24, 1782 – 1862) was a Virginia farmer and businessman.

== Early life ==
William Temple Thomson Mason was born on July 24, 1782, at Raspberry Plain. "Temple", as his family called him, was Thomson Mason's third child and youngest son with his second wife Elizabeth Westwood Wallace. He was named after his father's English cousin, Sir William Temple. While Temple was still an infant, Temple's father died on February 26, 1785, and he was raised by his mother and older half-brothers.

At the age of 19, Temple was sent to the College of William and Mary to obtain a gentleman's education. He spent two years at the college, graduating in 1803. Having reached the legal age of 21, Temple received a parcel of land in northern Loudoun County near Leesburg not far from Raspberry Plain, the house in which he grew up. According to Thomson Mason's last will and testament, recorded in Stafford County on September 26, 1784, he had bequeathed to Temple, his brother Westwood Thomson Mason and their half-brother, Abram Barnes Thomson Mason, several hundred acres of land along the Potomac River. On November 29, 1803, at the Loudoun County Courthouse in Leesburg, the three brothers filed a document which partitioned the land, with Temple receiving 757 acres (3.06 km^{2}).

== Family and career ==
Temple Mason built his home, Temple Hall, in the Federal style between 1810 and 1812. On June 16, 1812, Temple married Ann Eliza Carroll, daughter of Nicholas Maccubbin Carroll and Anne Jennings, in Annapolis, Maryland. Their first child, Temple Anna, was born at Temple Hall in 1813.

Temple Mason not only oversaw the management of his prosperous Temple Hall farm, but also became involved in the community life of Leesburg. He served as a vestryman at St. James Episcopal Church and oversaw the polls during elections in Loudoun County. As a mark of his increased social standing in the community, Temple's estate became a hub of Leesburg society. On August 9, 1825 Gilbert du Motier, marquis de Lafayette during his grand tour of the United States and accompanied by President John Quincy Adams and former President James Monroe (who was then residing at his Oak Hill plantation in southern Loudoun County) visited Temple Hall. The three gentlemen witnessed the baptism of Mason's two youngest daughters; Lafayette became the godfather for Mary Carroll, and Adams and Monroe became as Maria Louisa's godfathers.

Mason served one term in the Virginia House of Delegates, from 1830 to 1831, temporarily displacing veteran James McIlhaney.

Two of Temple Mason's sons and one of his daughters, Templeanna (1813–1849), died before the American Civil War. The same Leesburg, Virginia graveyard contains the remains of his sons Thomas Henry Carroll Mason (1822–1838) and Westwood Thomson Mason (1819–1854), the latter of whom died in Savannah, Georgia. Charles Carroll Mason (d. 1866) and Nicholas Carroll Mason (1810 - 1874) did not serve in either army in that conflict and are also buried in that cemetery; likewise William Temple Thomson Mason, Jr. (1800–1891), who would die and be buried in Tennessee. William T.T. Mason's daughter Eliza Mason Welch (1820–1899) married in Maryland in 1836 but spent most of her adult years and died in Iowa. In the 1850 U.S. Federal census, Mason owned more than a dozen enslaved people. William T.T. Mason of Washington, D.C. owned at least four enslaved people in 1860, a 5 year old black girl, 16 year old mulatto woman and 30 and 59 year old black and mulatto males.

== Later life ==
On January 2, 1857, six years after the death of his wife, and at the age of 75, Temple sold Temple Hall to Henry A. Ball for the sum of $50,000 (~$1.22 million in 2024) and retired to Georgetown in Washington, D.C. Temple Mason died in 1862 and was interred in the Old Episcopal Churchyard in Leesburg.

== Children ==
Temple and his wife Ann had at least eleven children:

- Temple Anna Mason (1813–June 5, 1849)
- Nicholas Carroll Mason (died May 3, 1873)
- Euphan Mason
- Ann Elizabeth Carroll Thomson Mason Magill (1815–September 13, 1844)
- Westwood Thomson Mason (1819–1853)
- William Temple Thomson Mason, Jr. (1820–December 31, 1891)
- Thomas Henry Carroll Mason (c. 1822–January 28, 1838)
- Maria Louisa Mason
- Mary Carter Mason (died 1897)
- John Thomson Mason (1827–June 2, 1891)
- Charles Carroll Mason (died August 28, 1866)

== Relations ==
William Temple Thomson Mason was a nephew of George Mason (1725–1792); son of Thomson Mason (1733–1785); half-brother of Stevens Thomson Mason (1760–1803) and John Thomson Mason (1765–1824); first cousin of George Mason V (1753–1796); first cousin once removed of Thomson Francis Mason (1785–1838), George Mason VI (1786–1834), Richard Barnes Mason (1797–1850), and James Murray Mason (1798–1871); uncle of Armistead Thomson Mason (1787–1819), John Thomson Mason (1787–1850), and John Thomson Mason, Jr. (1815–1873); and great uncle of Stevens Thomson Mason (1811–1843).
