= Locust Hill (Leesburg, Virginia) =

Historic house in Virginia, US

Coordinates: 39°9′14″N 77°34′11″W

Locust Hill is an early 19th-century Federal-style mansion north of Leesburg in Loudoun County, Virginia, United States. Locust Hill was the home of John Thomson Mason (15 March 1765–10 December 1824), a prominent American jurist and Attorney General of Maryland in 1806 and nephew of Founding Father of the United States George Mason.

== History ==
Locust Hill is believed to have been built for John Thomson Mason, a nephew of George Mason of Gunston Hall and son of Thomson Mason of nearby Raspberry Plain. Although no definite date of construction has been determined, stylistically the house probably dates from the first quarter of the 19th century.

Between 1847 and 1865, William Hill Gray, who twice served in the Virginia House of Delegates and once served as Leesburg's mayor, operated Locust Hill using enslaved labor. Although Gray was too old to fight on either side during the American Civil War and his son was too young, Locust Hill was raided several times, and Gray briefly taken prisoner twice to Washington, D.C. before receiving a parole and serving as president of Loudoun County's justices of the peace following the conflict. Gray's creditors foreclosed on the plantation in 1865, and it was transferred to R. Beverley Clark in 1868.

== Architecture ==
Locust Hill is a Federal-style Flemish-bond brick house situated on the first rise of the eastern slope of Catoctin Mountain. The residence features a brick water table, twelve-over-twelve double-sash windows, and fanlights over each of the formal entrances. Locust Hill's two-story front portico with stylized American order capitals served as the inaugural stand from Franklin D. Roosevelt's second presidential inauguration in 1937.

Locust Hill's property also features several farm buildings, one which is an early 20th-century frame barn with a jerkinhead roof.

== Events ==
- Ann Mason Tutt (1807–1873), daughter of Charles Pendleton Tutt and Ann Mason Chichester, married Charles Bonnycastle at Locust Hill on 10 January 1826.
- Mary Barnes Tutt (1815–1898), daughter of Charles Pendleton Tutt and Ann Mason Chichester, married John Aris Throckmorton at Locust Hill on 14 March 1839.
