= Temple Hall =

Historic house in Virginia, United States

- U.S. National Register of Historic Places
- Virginia Landmarks Register
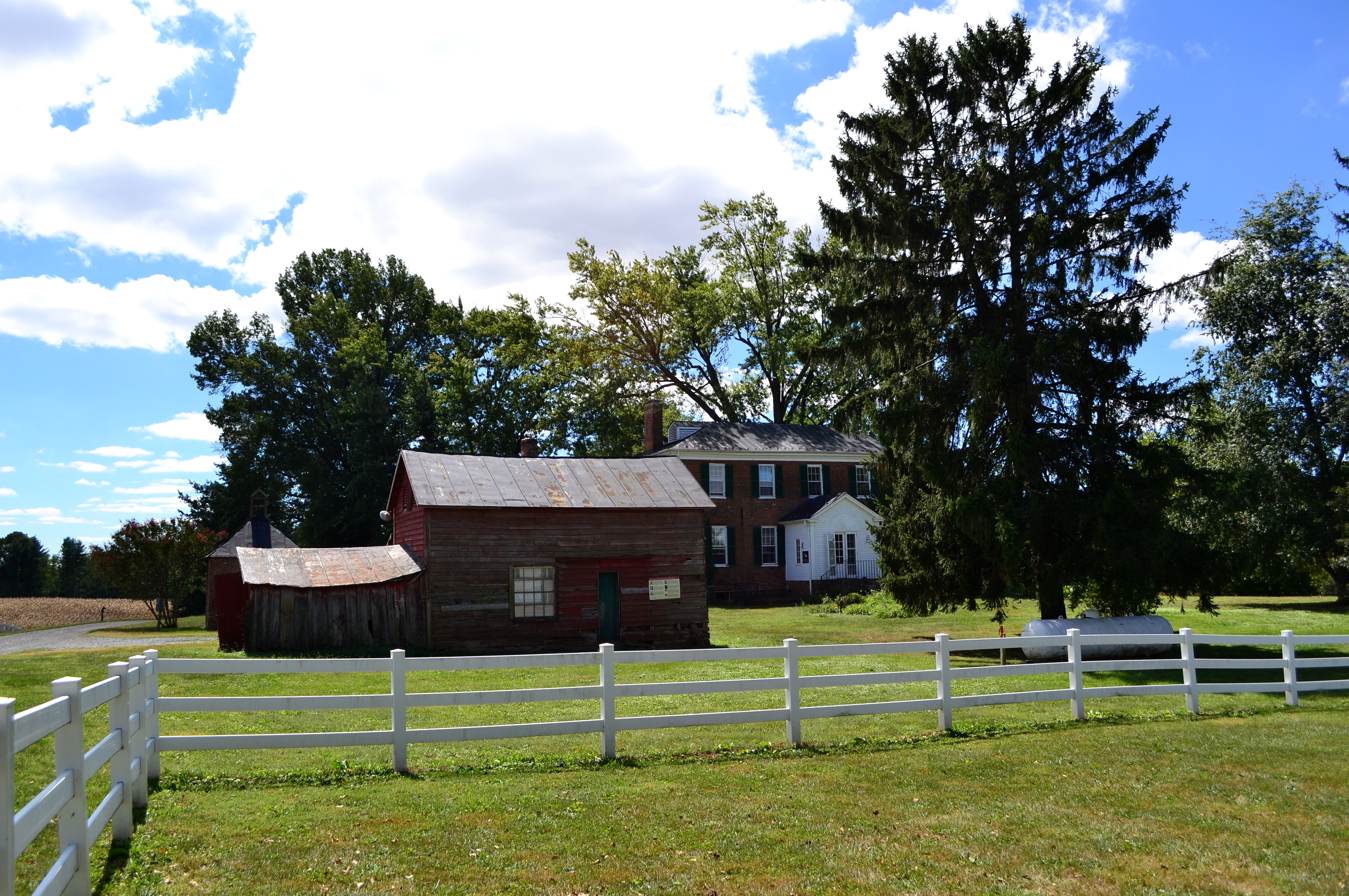

- Location within Virginia
- Location: 15764 Temple Hall Lane, Leesburg, Virginia
- Coordinates: 39°10′54.39″N 77°31′43.55″W
- Area: 286 acres (116 ha)
- Built: 1810
- Architectural style: Federal style
- NRHP reference No.: 07000053
- VLR No.: 053-0303

Significant dates
- Added to NRHP: February 13, 2007
- Designated VLR: September 6, 2006; May 15, 2007

Temple Hall is an early 19th-century Federal-style mansion and working farm near the Potomac River north of Leesburg in Loudoun County, Virginia.

== History ==
Temple Hall was constructed in 1810 for William Temple Thomson Mason (24 July 1782–1862), a son of Thomson Mason and his second wife Elizabeth Westwood Wallace of nearby Raspberry Plain, and nephew of George Mason. The estate became a hub of Leesburg society and was visited by Gilbert du Motier, marquis de Lafayette during his grand tour of the United States on 9 August 1825. Lafayette was accompanied by President John Quincy Adams and former President James Monroe, who was then residing at his Oak Hill plantation in southern Loudoun County. The three gentlemen witnessed the baptism of Mason's two youngest daughters at Temple Hall with Lafayette serving as godfather for Mary Carroll, and Adams and Monroe serving as Maria Louisa's godfathers. Altogether, Mason and his wife, Ann Eliza Carroll, raised ten children at Temple Hall. In addition to the Mason family, approximately twenty enslaved African-Americans resided on the property. Under Mason's management, the Temple Hall estate was a modestly successful farm. Mason cultivated orchards and raised corn, wheat, and livestock.

Mason retired to Washington, D.C. in 1857 and sold his farm to Henry A. Ball, who farmed it with using approximately 20 enslaved young men, 17 under age 16. Ball favored secession, and after Virginia voted for secession as the American Civil War began, two of Henry Ball's enlisted in the Confederate States Army's cavalry. In 1862, Henry Ball was arrested for refusing to take an oath of allegiance to the Federal Government. Ball was released after spending nearly a year in the Old Capitol Prison. John S. Mosby visited Temple Hall on 5 July 1864 and dined with the Ball family. While at the house, Mosby received information that led to the action at Mount Zion Church. Temple Hall remained in the Ball family until 1878 when it was sold at auction.

In 1940, after a succession of owners, the Temple Hall property was purchased by Mr. and Mrs. James H. Symington. The Symingtons restored the mansion and made extensive renovations. They modernized Temple Hall by adding indoor plumbing and electricity. The Symingtons planted a variety of crops and eventually began specializing in popcorn. They became the largest suppliers in the eastern United States until the popcorn market collapsed after World War II. Afterwards, the Symingtons turned to raising livestock, including cattle and hogs, as well as wheat, corn, and hay for animal feed. Mrs. Symington assumed management of the farm's operations after her husband became ill in the 1970s, and continued to operate it after his death. Concerned about Loudoun County's rapid development and population growth, Mrs. Symington donated the 286 acre farm to the Northern Virginia Regional Park Authority (NVRPA) in 1985. Since then, the NVRPA has operated Temple Hall as a working farm and interpretive center. Temple Hall, along with several neighboring estates including nearby Mason family estate Raspberry Plain, is a contributing property in the 25,000-acre (10,000 ha) Catoctin Rural Historic District, which was added to the National Register of Historic Places on 31 January 1989. Temple Hall was listed on the National Register on 13 February 2007.

== Architecture ==
Temple Hall is an early 19th-century Federal-style mansion. It is a Flemish bond brick house with a five-bay facade and is topped by a hipped roof. A small Doric portico shelters the central entrance which is surmounted by a graceful semicircular fanlight. Temple Hall also exhibits tall six-over-six double-sash windows, a frieze encircling the building, and tall interior end chimneys. The property also features a square brick smokehouse and two 19th-century frame barns.
