= Emily Virginia Mason =

American poet and nurse (1815–1909)

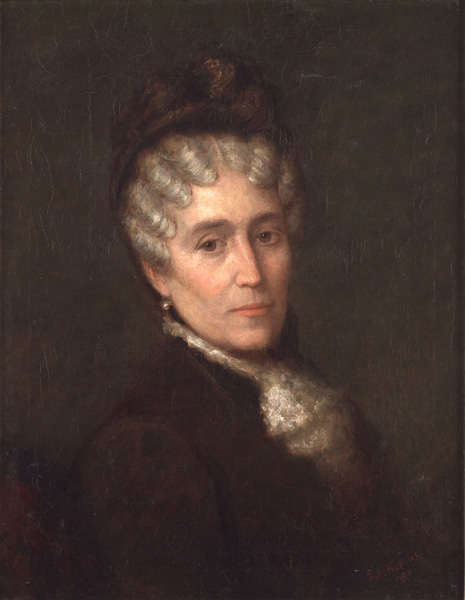
- Born: October 15, 1815; Lexington, Kentucky
- Died: February 16, 1909 (aged 93); Georgetown, Washington, D.C.
- Occupations: Nurse, poet, educator

Emily Virginia Mason (1815–1909) was an American poet and nurse. Coming from a prestigious Virginia family, she served as a nurse with the Confederate army during the American Civil War.

== Biography ==
Emily Virginia Mason was born in Lexington, Kentucky, on 15 October 1815. Emily was born into the prestigious Mason family of Virginia; her father was lawyer John Thomson Mason, a federal marshal and hero of the Texas Revolution, her grandfather Stevens Thomson Mason was a US senator from Virginia, and her great-grandfather Thomson Mason was the younger brother of United States Founding Father George Mason. Emily Mason grew up in Kentucky, Michigan, and Virginia, and in her formative years was educated at the Emma Willard School in New York. By the 1850s, she had settled in Alexandria, Virginia.

During the American Civil War, Emily and much of the Mason family sided with the state of Virginia, which had broken from the Union and joined the Confederate States of America. Early in the war, Mason fled further south after the Union army occupied her native Fairfax County, with Mason eventually becoming a nurse in Confederate service. During her time as a nurse, Mason worked to establish a hospital in White Sulphur Springs; she would later work as a nurse in hospitals in Charlottesville, Lynchburg, and Richmond, writing accounts of her work in local newspapers. She took care of wounded soldiers, and in one instance procured a large Christmas feast for the men in her care. According to one source, Mason - having acquired a pair of Confederate general Robert E. Lee's old socks - used said socks to intimidate, shame, and inspire men into re-joining their units. By April 1865, Mason was working as a nurse and matron at Winder Hospital in Richmond, Virginia.

After the end of the Civil War in 1865, Mason wrote and published a number of poems about the war. These poems sold well, with Mason using the funding to support girl's education in the South. In the 1870s, she travelled to Paris to teach at an American school for girls in the city, and would eventually become principle of the school. She returned to the United States in 1884 and died in 1909.
