= Selma (Leesburg, Virginia) =

Coordinates: 39°09′42″N 77°33′22″W

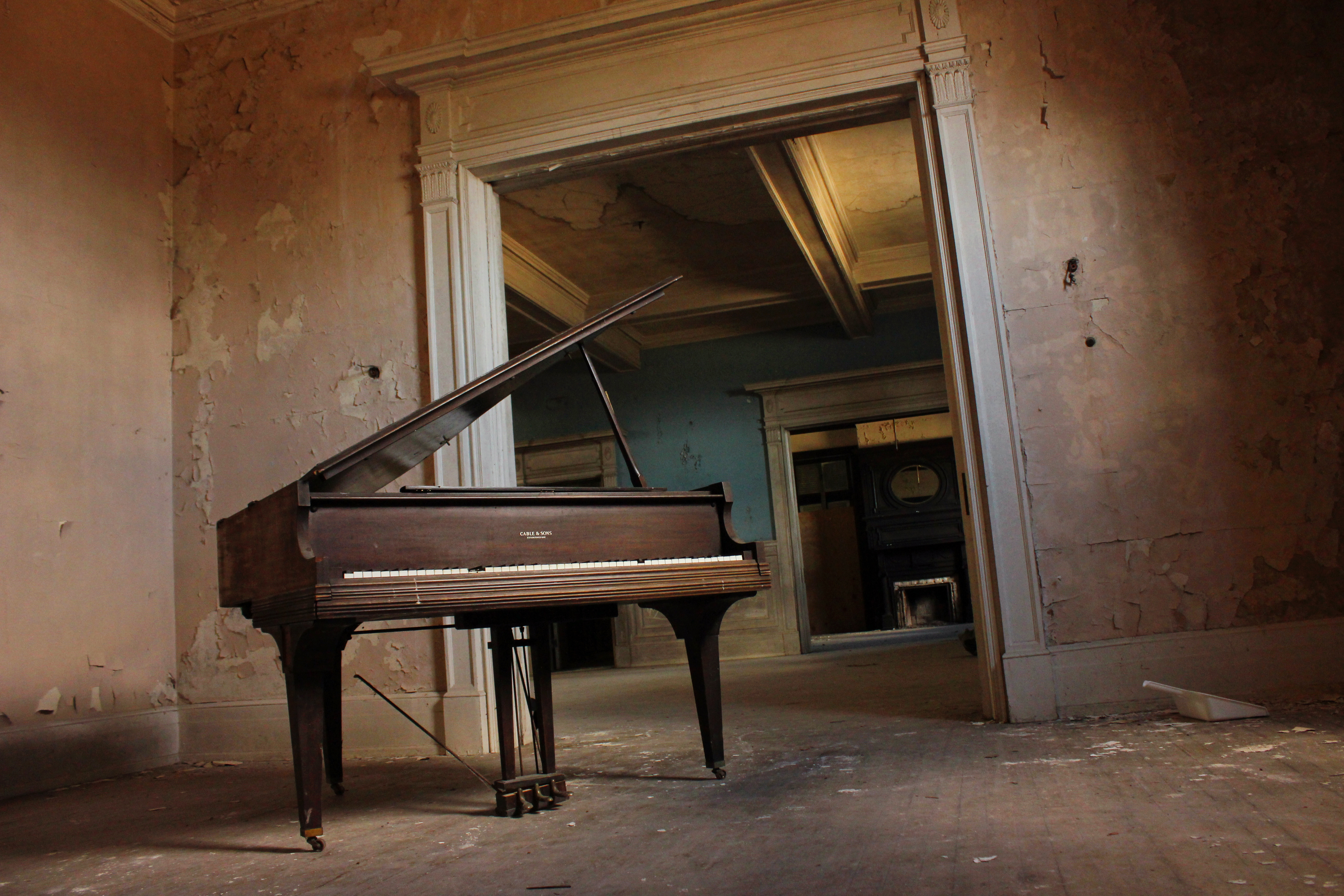
A piano at Selma

Selma is a historic property and former plantation in Loudoun County, Virginia, near Leesburg. Selma is best known as the residence of Armistead Thomson Mason (4 August 1787–6 February 1819), a U.S. Senator from Virginia from 1816 through 1817.

== History ==
The lands of Selma were once a part of the Northern Neck Proprietary owned by Lord Fairfax, and Selma was a part of the 10,000-acre (4,000 ha) tract bought around 1741 by Stevens Thomson Mason.

Selma was built at the base of Catoctin Mountain overlooking a sweeping vista of lawn and pastureland between 1800 and 1810 by Armistead Thomson Mason. Mason came to be known as the "Chief of Selma." Due to a political quarrel between Mason and his cousin Colonel John Mason McCarty, he and McCarty dueled at the Bladensburg dueling grounds in Bladensburg on 6 February 1819. Mason and McCarty chose Bladensburg as the location of their duel due to Virginia's recently enacted anti-dueling law. Mason died at the first shot, while McCarty was spared by an accident but dangerously wounded. While Mason's widow continued to reside at Selma with their young son, Stevens Thomson Mason, Jr., McCarty and his family settled nearby at Strawberry Plain.

Though living a few miles apart, however, the Mason and McCarty families never renewed their acquaintance. McCarty was an avid hunter and one day while following the flight of game, he mounted a fence that formed the boundary between the Mason and McCarty properties, and attempted loading his rifle from that position. McCarty allowed his attention to be diverted by the movements of the birds or the hunting dogs which resulted in his gun slipping. It exploded and sent the ramrod through his head. Armistead Thomson Mason's son, Stevens Thomson Mason, Jr., found McCarty and carried him to nearby Raspberry Plain, Mason's birthplace and the home of his father Stevens Thomson Mason.

Selma was inherited by Mason's only son, Stevens Thomson Mason, Jr. At age 21, Mason was a rich and attractive young man and was often seen driving a handsome pair of horses tandem through Leesburg. A too generous expenditure of his fortune brought reverses which forced Mason to sell Selma. Upon selling Selma, Mason joined the United States Army and while serving as a captain in the Mexican–American War was mortally wounded.

All but the original part of Selma was destroyed by fire in the early 1890s. In 1896 the property was purchased by Elijah B. White, the son of Elijah V. White. White commissioned Richmond architecture firm Noland and Baskervill to design a Colonial Revival mansion, which was built between 1900 and 1902 and included part of the earlier house as a kitchen wing. No expense was spared in achieving a level of luxury, including modern conveniences such as "speaking tubes", a form of intercom system. By the 1920s, the Whites were known to hold many high society events and parties at the plantation with Governors, Senators and Congressman in attendance, and was regularly featured in the society pages of newspapers and magazines.

The plantation remained in the White family for several generations, before being sold to the Epperson family in 1976, who turned the estate into a wedding and function venue. Following a succession of owners, Selma was sold to a foreign investor in 1999 and fell into neglect. A parcel of the original 212-acre Selma Plantation was sold to a local developer in 2002, leaving Selma with a 50-acre conservancy lot. In 2009, the nonprofit group Preservation Virginia placed the mansion on its "Most Endangered Historic Sites List."

After years of neglect and vandalism, Selma was purchased in March 2016 by Sharon D. Virts and Scott F. Miller, and is currently undergoing a massive restoration project as a private home.

== Architecture ==
The present Selma is a two and one half-story, hip-roofed, stuccoed brick mansion. Selma is considered Loudoun County's earliest and best example of Colonial Revival architecture. Selma features an imposing tetrastyle Roman Doric portico with a full entablature and triangular pediment. The dwelling also exhibits a modillion cornice with dentils, pedimented dormers, twelve-over-one double-sash windows, and tall interior end chimneys. Selma's central entrance is surmounted by a large semicircular fanlight with tracery and flanked by engaged fluted Roman Ionic columns.

A board-and-batten smokehouse, frame garage, and frame barn with three cupolas also lie on the Selma property and appear to date from the early 20th century as well.
