= Emily Mason =

Emily Mason may refer to:

- Emily Mason (painter) (1932–2019), American painter
- Emily Mason (soccer) (born 2002), American soccer player
- Emily Virginia Mason (1815–1909), American poet
