= James M. Mason =

American politician (1798–1871)

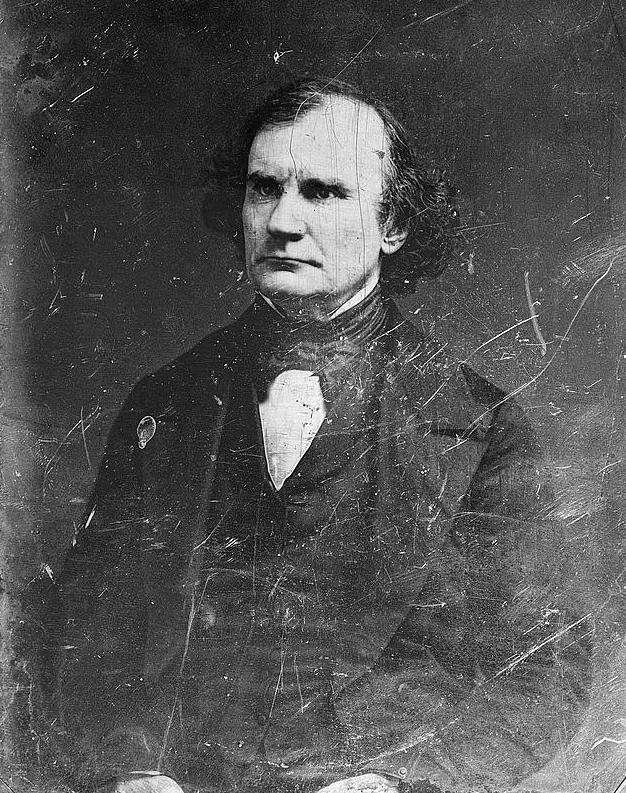
- Portrait by Mathew Brady

President pro tempore of the United States Senate
- In office January 6, 1857 – March 3, 1857
- Preceded by: Jesse D. Bright
- Succeeded by: Thomas J. Rusk

United States Senator from Virginia
- In office January 21, 1847 – March 28, 1861
- Preceded by: Isaac S. Pennybacker
- Succeeded by: Waitman T. Willey

Member of the U.S. House of Representatives from Virginia's 15th district
- In office March 4, 1837 – March 3, 1839
- Preceded by: Edward Lucas
- Succeeded by: William Lucas

Member of the Virginia House of Delegates from Frederick County
- In office December 1, 1828 – December 4, 1831 Serving with William Castleman Jr. and William Wood
- Preceded by: William Barton
- Succeeded by: Constituency reestablished
- In office December 4, 1826 – December 2, 1827 Serving with James Ship
- Preceded by: George Kiger
- Succeeded by: William Barton

Personal details
- Born: James Murray Mason; November 3, 1798 Analostan Island, D.C., U.S.
- Died: April 28, 1871 (aged 72) Alexandria, Virginia, U.S.
- Resting place: Christ Church; Alexandria, Virginia, U.S.
- Party: Jacksonian Democratic
- Spouse: Eliza Chew
- Relations: George Mason V (uncle); George Mason (grandfather); Thomson Mason (granduncle)
- Education: University of Pennsylvania (BA); College of William & Mary (LLB)

James Murray Mason (November 3, 1798 – April 28, 1871) was an American lawyer and politician who became a Confederate diplomat. He served as U.S. Senator from Virginia for fourteen years, having previously represented Virginia's 15th congressional district in the U.S. House of Representatives, and Frederick County in the Virginia House of Delegates.

A grandson of George Mason, Mason strongly supported slavery as well as Virginia's secession as the American Civil War began. He was chairman of the United States Senate Committee on Foreign Relations from 1851 until his expulsion in 1861 for supporting the Confederate States of America, and he took great interest in protecting American cotton exporters. As the Confederacy's leading diplomat, he traveled to Europe seeking support, but proved unable to get the United Kingdom to recognize the Confederacy as a country. As Mason sailed to England in November 1861, the U.S. Navy captured the British ship on which he was sailing and detained him, in what became known as the Trent Affair. Released after two months, Mason continued his voyage and assisted Confederate purchases from Britain and Europe, but he failed to achieve their diplomatic involvement. As the war ended, Mason went into exile in Canada, but later returned to Alexandria, Virginia, where he died in 1871.

== Early life ==
Mason was born on Analostan Island, now Theodore Roosevelt Island, in the District of Columbia. He graduated from the University of Pennsylvania (1818), then studied law in Williamsburg, Virginia, and earned a law degree from the College of William & Mary's Law School (1820).

== Political career ==
Following admission to the Virginia bar, Mason practiced law in Virginia, and also operated a plantation in Frederick County. A partially illegible census record shows that he may have owned five slaves in 1830. In the 1850 federal census, Mason owned ten enslaved people, half of them children under ten years of age. In that year, he (or another man of similar name) also owned a 25-year-old Black woman and her four children in nearby Rappahannock County. In the 1860 census, Mason owned a 49-year-old Black man, a 35-year-old Black woman, and children aged 14, 13, 12, 10 and 3 years old. and he or another James M. Mason owned seven enslaved children (the eldest a 13-year-old girl) in southern Culpeper County.

Mason soon began his political career, well before his father's death, winning election several times as one of Frederick County's (part-time) representatives in the Virginia House of Delegates. His first term began on December 4, 1826, alongside one-term veteran James Ship, but only Ship won re-election the following year. In 1828, Ship failed to win re-election and Mason won the election to represent the gateway to the Shenandoah Valley together with William Castleman, Jr., and both won re-election the following year. After veteran legislator Hierome L. Opie, one of the four joint delegates of Frederick and neighboring Jefferson County to the Virginia Constitutional Convention of 1829-1830, resigned, Mason took his place alongside John R. Cooke, congressman Alfred H. Powell and fellow delegate Thomas Griggs Jr.

Although some had hoped that convention would limit slaveholder power, the resulting constitution only gave additional votes to western Virginians (including those in Frederick County and those counties which would secede and become West Virginia during the American Civil War), so Mason and Castleman were re-elected and joined by William Wood for the 1830–1831 legislative session.

In 1836, Congressman Edward Lucas of Shepherdstown (in what would become West Virginia decades later) announced his retirement. Voters in Virginia's 15th congressional district elected Mason as his successor in the Twenty-fifth United States Congress. The Jackson Democrat only served a single term, and was succeeded by Lucas' brother William Lucas.

In 1847, Virginia legislators elected Mason to the Senate after incumbent Isaac S. Pennybacker died in office, and Mason won re-election in 1850 and 1856. Mason famously read aloud the dying Senator John C. Calhoun's final speech to the Senate, on March 4, 1850, which warned of the likely breakup of the country if the North did not permanently accept the existence of slavery in the South, as well as its expansion into the Western territories. Mason also complained of Northern personal liberty laws, intended to help fugitive slaves: "Although the loss of property is felt, the loss of honor is felt still more."

Mason was President pro tempore of the Senate for two months in early 1857 (January 6 to March 3).

=== Champion of slavery ===
Mason "championed the Southern political platform", "and slavery, another of the three themes that most affected his life, lay at the core of that political ideology." (The other two themes were the secession of Virginia and the establishment of the Confederacy.)

Mason was not only a white supremacist, he believed that negroes were "the great curse of the country". Giving Blacks the vote particularly offended him; it was, he thought, the rule of the mob and the "end of the republic".

He so believed in the beneficence of slavery that, unlike many others in Frederick County, Mason refused to support the colonization project that led to the founding of Liberia. Mason's solution to the "problem" of free blacks was returning them to slavery, stating they were better off enslaved in the United States than they could possibly be in Africa. Mason believed that slavery did not need to be established or require a law to make it legal; it had already been established by God, as recorded in the Bible. It already existed in Africa: "The negro is as much property in Africa as the bullock or the ox". His position was that Congress had no authority to prohibit slavery anywhere, and certainly not in Kansas. Slavery was a condition, not an institution, by which he meant that Americans were not enslaving Africans, they were merely purchasing them from other Africans that had already enslaved them.

Mason wrote the Fugitive Slave Law of 1850, arguably the most hated and openly-evaded Federal legislation in U.S. history. The whole idea of using "popular sovereignty" as a means to expand slavery into the Western territories, starting with Kansas, leading to the Kansas-Nebraska Act and the violence of the Bleeding Kansas period, was hatched in Mason's Washington boarding house. Mason a was also the chair of the ad-hoc Senate committee that investigated John Brown's raid on Harpers Ferry, and wrote its report, informally known as the Mason Report.

=== Secession advocate ===
Continuing the tradition of his mentor John C. Calhoun, whose last speech (1850) Mason read to the Senate when Calhoun was too sick to do so himself, Mason strongly believed states had the right to secede. Furthermore, the North's intolerance of their "peculiar institution", their "property rights" (the right to own human beings), left them no other choice than secession. He said he didn't need reasons to leave the Union, he needed a reason to stay in the Union.

Mason strongly favored the South's "immediate, absolute, and eternal separation" if anti-slavery, Republican candidate John C. Frémont were elected president in 1856.

In 1861 Mason worked behind the scenes to enable Virginia's secession, remaining in the Senate because he could get information useful for the seceding states, a type of spy behind enemy lines. He and Virginia's other Senator, Robert Hunter, told the commissioners of the new Confederate states that Virginia would join the secession if Jefferson Davis was elected president of a Southern confederacy, but not if it was radical Alabama "fire-rater" William L. Yancey, seen in Virginia as too extreme. Davis was chosen as president three days later.

Mason disappears from Senate activities in March 1861. He and other Southern senators were expelled from the Senate on July 11 by a vote of 32 to 10, because "they were engaged in a conspiracy for the destruction of the Union and Government, or, with full knowledge of said conspiracy, had failed to advise the Government of its progress or aid in its suppression."

== Confederate diplomat ==
Mason became one of Virginia's representatives to the Provisional Confederate Congress from February 1861 through February 1862. However, his legislative duties were interrupted by a diplomatic assignment. While Mason sailed toward England as a Confederate envoy to Britain on the British mail steamer RMS Trent, the ship was stopped by the USS San Jacinto on November 8, 1861. Mason and fellow Confederate diplomat John Slidell were taken off the ship and confined in Fort Warren in Boston Harbor.

The Trent Affair threatened to bring Britain into open war with the United States, despite triumphant rhetoric in the north. Even the cool-headed Lincoln was swept along in the celebratory spirit, but enthusiasm waned when he and his cabinet studied the likely consequences of a war with Britain. After careful diplomatic exchanges, they admitted that the capture was contrary to maritime law and that private citizens could not be classified as "enemy despatches". Slidell and Mason were released, and war was averted. The two diplomats set sail for England again, via the British colony of St. Thomas, on January 1, 1862.

Mason represented the Confederacy in England, attempting to convince the British that the Union's blockade of the South was just a "paper blockade", too ineffective to qualify for recognition under the terms of the 1856 Declaration of Paris, but his primary mission was to seek British diplomatic recognition of the Confederacy. After Britain issued its refusal in 1863, he moved to Paris, continuing his search for a nation that would recognize or assist the Confederacy, but the French were unwilling to do so alone, without the support of the British. He remained in France until April 1865.

== Later life ==
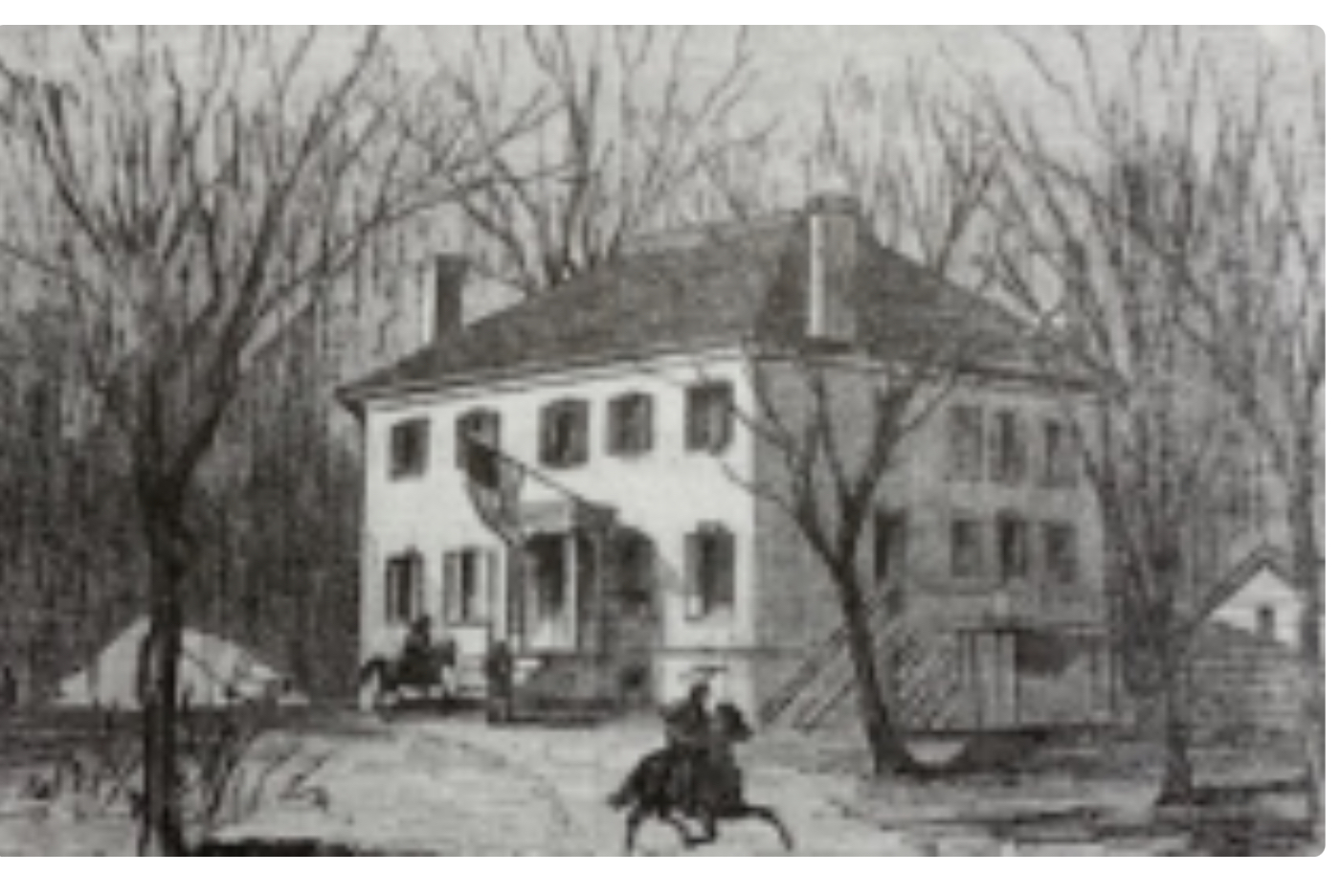
First Selma mansion, Winchester, Virginia, destroyed in 1863

In 1862, when the Union army occupied Winchester, Virginia, where Mason made his home, his house, "Selma", (Note: Other Virginia houses named "Selma" are in Eastville and Leesburg, Virginia.) was requisitioned for regimental offices. The lower officers probably did not know who Mason was, but the commanding officer, General Nathaniel P. Banks, formerly a Congressman and then Governor of Massachusetts, certainly must have.

Learning of Mason's pro-slavery activism and his authorship of the hated Fugitive Slave Act, the soldiers, on their own initiative, set about destroying the house . The roof came off first. Sometime later the walls were pulled down and everything burnable was chopped into firewood. They were so thorough that "from turret to foundation stone, not one stone remains upon another; the negro houses, the out-buildings [there was an ice house], the fences are all gone, and even the trees are many of them girdled". According to Mason, the house was "obliterated". He never lived in Winchester again.

From 1865 until 1868 Mason was in exile in Canada. After sanctions on Confederate officials were lifted, he returned to the United States, and bought the Clarens Estate, on 26 acres (11 ha), (Note: In 2008 the house alone sold for over $8,000,000, equivalent to $11,962,906 in 2025.) today in Alexandria, Virginia. He brought white servants from Canada, and went to some trouble to find others, as he did not want to hire any blacks; he believed free blacks to be "worse than worthless". He died at Clarens in 1871, and was interred in the churchyard of Christ Church in Alexandria. His death was not noted by anyone outside his family.

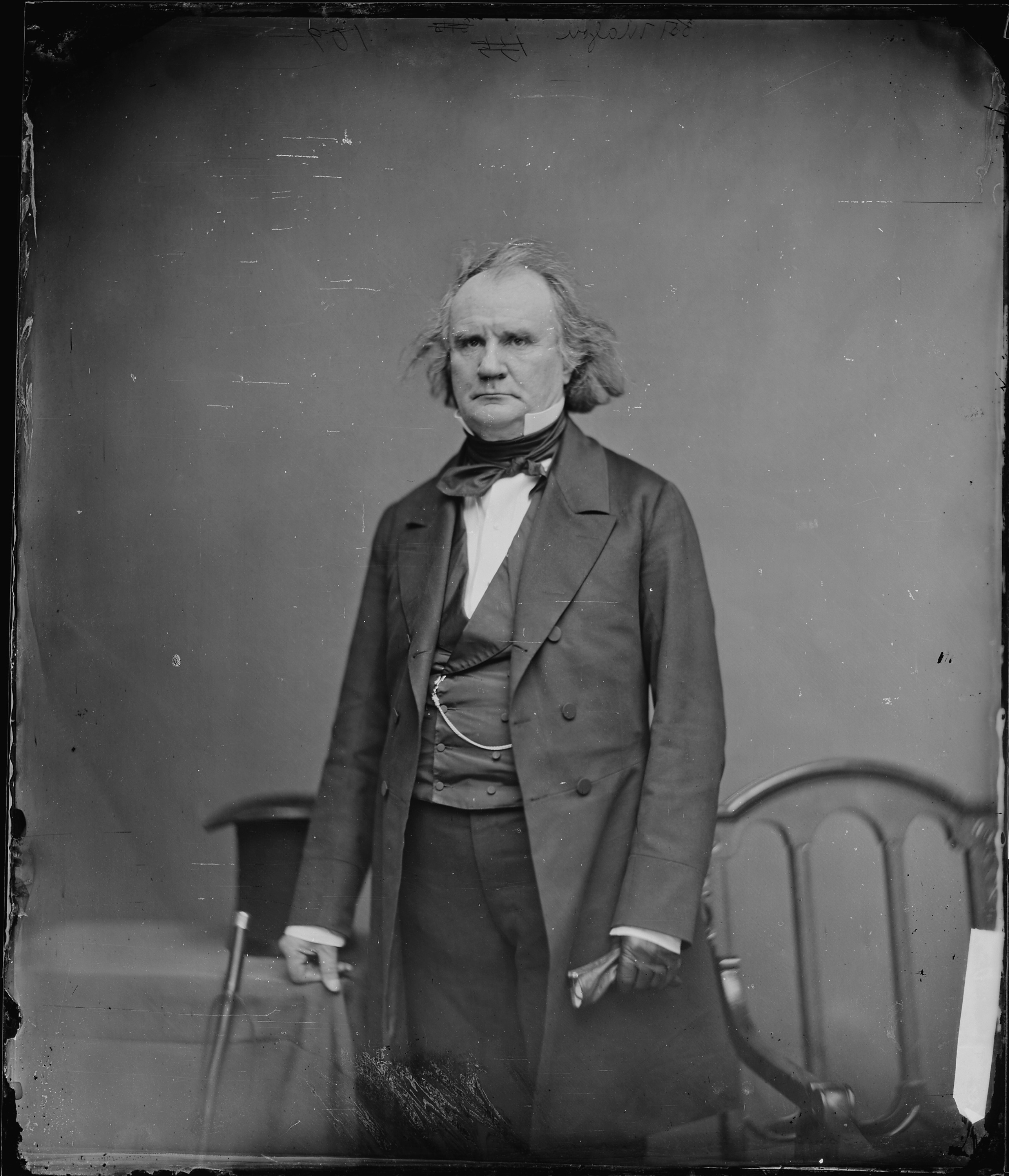
James M. Mason, photograph by Mathew Brady

== Family ==
=== Marriage and children ===
Mason married Eliza Margaretta Chew (1798–1874) on 25 July 1822 at Cliveden in Germantown, Pennsylvania. The couple had eight children:

- Anna Maria Mason Ambler (31 January 1825 – 17 August 1863)
- Benjamin Chew Mason (1826–1847)
- Catharine Chew Mason Dorsey (24 March 1828 – 28 April 1893)
- George Mason (16 April 1830 – 3 February 1895)
- Virginia Mason (12 December 1833 – 11 October 1920)
- Eliza Ida Oswald Mason (10 August 1836 – 16 December 1885)
- James Murray Mason, Jr. (24 August 1839 – 10 January 1923)
- John A. Mason (17 November 1841 – 6 June 1925)

He was a grandson of George Mason (1725–1792); nephew of George Mason V (1753–1796); grandnephew of Thomson Mason (1733–1785); first cousin once removed of Stevens Thomson Mason (1760–1803) and John Thomson Mason (1765–1824); son of John Mason (1766–1849) and Anna Maria Murray Mason (1776–1857); first cousin of Thomson Francis Mason (1785–1838), George Mason VI (1786–1834), and Richard Barnes Mason (1797–1850); second cousin of Armistead Thomson Mason (1787–1819), John Thomson Mason (1787–1850), and John Thomson Mason, Jr. (1815–1873); second cousin once removed of Stevens Thomson Mason (1811–1843); and first cousin thrice removed of Charles O'Conor Goolrick.

- Sister Sarah Maria was the wife of Confederate general Adjutant Samuel Cooper (general).
- Sister Anna Maria was the wife of Sydney Smith Lee-son of Henry "Light Horse Harry" Lee; they were the parents of Confederate Major General and Virginia Governor Fitzhugh Lee.
- Brother John T. married Catherine Macomb, daughter of Gen. Alexander Macomb, Jr., Commanding General of the army (1828–1841).

Ancestors of James M. Mason

16. George Mason II
8. George Mason III
17. Mary Fowke
4. George Mason IV
18. Stevens Thomson
9. Ann Stevens Thomson
19. Dorothea Taunton
2. John Mason
20. William Eilbeck
10. William Eilbeck
21. Margaret Dixon
5. Ann Eilbeck
22. John Edgar
11. Sarah Edgar
23. Johanna
1. James Murray Mason
24. James Murray
12. William Murray
25. Sarah Thomas
6. James Murray
26. James Smith
13. Ann Smith
27. Sarah Hynson
3. Anna Maria Murray
28. Daniel Maynadier
14. Daniel Maynadier
29. Hannah Haskins
7. Sarah Ennalls Maynadier
30. William Vans Murray
15. Mary Murray
31. Sarah Ennalls

== Assessments by political opponents ==
One perspective comes from Republican politician Carl Schurz. His visit to Washington coincided with debate over the Kansas-Nebraska Act.

Still another type was represented to me by Senator Mason of Virginia, a thick-set, heavily built man with a decided expression of dullness in his face. What he had to say appeared to me to come from a sluggish intellect spurred into activity by an overweening self-conceit. He, too, would constantly assert in manner, even more than in language, the superiority of the Southern slave-holder over the Northern people. But it was not the prancing pride of Senator Butler nor the cheery buoyancy of the fighting spirit of Toombs that animated him. It appeared rather to be the surly pretension of a naturally stupid person to be something better than other people, and the insistence that they must bow to his assumed aristocracy and all its claims. When I heard Senator Mason speak, I felt that if I were a member of the Senate, his supercilious attitude and his pompous utterances of dull commonplace, sometimes very offensive by their overbearing tone, would have been particularly exasperating to me.

A leading Republican Senator Charles Sumner commented:

Among these hostile senators, there is yet another, with all the prejudices of the senator from South Carolina, but without his generous impulses, who, on account of his character. before the country, and the rancor of his opposition, deserves to be named. I mean the senator from Virginia [Mr. Mason], who, as the author of the Fugitive Slave Bill, has associated himself with a special act of inhumanity and tyranny. Of him I shall say little, for he has said little in this debate, though within that little was compressed the bitterness of a life absorbed in the support of Slavery. He holds the commission of Virginia; but he does not represent that early Virginia, so clear to our hearts, which gave to us the pen of Jefferson, by which the equality of men was declared, and the sword of Washington, by which Independence was secured; but he represents that other Virginia, from which Washington and Jefferson now avert their faces, where human beings are bred as cattle for the shambles, and where a dungeon rewards the pious matron who teaches little children to relieve their bondage by reading the Book of Life. It is proper that such a senator, representing such a State, should rail against Free Kansas.

== See also ==
- List of United States senators expelled or censured

U.S. House of Representatives
| Preceded by Edward Lucas | Member of the U.S. House of Representatives from Virginia's 15th congressional district 1837–1839 | Succeeded by William Lucas |
U.S. Senate
| Preceded by Isaac S. Pennybacker | U.S. Senator (Class 1) from Virginia; 1847–1861; Served alongside: William S. Archer, Robert Hunter | Succeeded by Waitman T. Willey |
| Preceded by Isaac S. Pennybacker | Chair of the Senate Claims Committee; 1847–1849 | Succeeded by Moses Norris Jr. |
| Preceded by Herschel Johnson | Chair of the Senate District of Columbia Committee; 1849–1851 | Succeeded by James Shields |
| Preceded by David Levy Yulee | Chair of the Senate Naval Affairs Committee; 1851–1852 | Succeeded by William M. Gwin |
| Preceded by Henry S. Foote | Chair of the Senate Foreign Relations Committee; 1852–1861 | Succeeded by Charles Sumner |
Political offices
| Preceded by Jesse D. Bright | President pro tempore of the United States Senate; 1857 | Succeeded by Thomas Rusk |
