= Stafford Hall =

Coordinates: 39°39′50″N 77°54′26″W

Stafford Hall is an early 19th-century Federal-style mansion near Clear Spring in Washington County, Maryland, United States. Stafford Hall was the residence of John Thomson Mason, Jr. (May 9, 1815 – March 28, 1873), a U.S. Congressman from Maryland, representing the sixth district from 1841 to 1843.

== History ==
Stafford Hall is a large two-story 36 room brick and stone mansion with nine double chimneys built around 1835 by John Thomson Mason, Jr. Mason named his property after Staffordshire, a homeplace of his great-great-great-grandfather Colonel George Mason I (5 June 1629–1686). Stafford Hall was later purchased by Mason's law classmate and Governor of Maryland, William Thomas Hamilton. Hamilton resided at the property for almost 50 years. In 1920, Stafford Hall was bought by the Leo Cohill family.

Stafford Hall had one of the largest apple orchards in the surrounding area. Its orchard produced more than 50,000 bushels of apples a year and employed hundreds of area residents. Nearby canning corporations including Musselman purchased apples from the Stafford Hall orchard. Stafford Hall Apples were shipped all over the United States, and to England and France. In the 1930s, lightning struck the packing house killing two workers.

== Legend ==
Local legend asserts the existence of a secret hidden room at Stafford Hall and that anyone discovers the room dies shortly afterwards. Legend also holds that a prominent magistrate from Hagerstown found the room in 1924 and died within the year. In 1926, Leo Cohill's nine-year-old daughter Margaret became ill after finding the room and admitted what she had done on her deathbed, begging her family members to not seek out the room.
