= Kate Mason Rowland =

American author, historian, genealogist, biographer, editor, historic preservationist

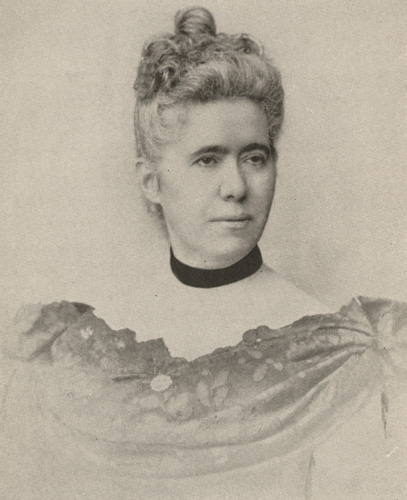
- Portrait of Rowland
- Born: June 22, 1840; Detroit, Michigan
- Died: June 28, 1916 (aged 76); Richmond, Virginia
- Occupations: author, genealogist, historian, biographer, editor, historic preservationist
- Relatives: great-great-grandniece of George Mason

Kate Mason Rowland (June 22, 1840 – June 28, 1916) was an American author, historian, genealogist, biographer, editor and historic preservationist. Rowland is best known for her biography of her great-great-granduncle, George Mason, a Founding Father of the United States. Rowland was also a charter member of the United Daughters of the Confederacy. She later went by the name of "Kate Mason."

== Early life ==
Kate Mason Rowland and her twin sister, Elizabeth Moir Mason Rowland, were born on June 22, 1840, to Major Isaac S. Rowland and his wife, Catherine Armistead Mason. Rowland was a granddaughter of John Thomson Mason and a niece of Stevens Thomson Mason.

== American Civil War ==
Rowland volunteered for the Confederate States Army during the American Civil War. She served as a nurse at Camp Winder Hospital in Richmond, Virginia. On April 4, 1865, after the Confederate government abandoned Richmond, Rowland, then a matron at the Marine Hospital (also known as the Naval Hospital), sang "patriotic songs" to hospitalized soldiers. She described the scene in her diary as "overflowing with merriment," in which a casual observer would "hardly realize we were all prisoners" of the Union. Both of Rowland's brothers, Thomas Rowland (1842–1874) and John Thomson Mason (1844–1901), served in the Confederate States Army.

== Civic and organizational involvement ==
Rowland was a charter member of the United Daughters of the Confederacy. Rowland found the moniker "War of the Rebellion" for the American Civil War unacceptable. She introduced a resolution at a United Daughters of the Confederacy meeting in November 1899 requiring members to "use every influence, as a body and individually, to expel from the literature of the country and from the daily press, the phrase, 'war of the rebellion,' and to have substituted for it the phrase, 'War Between the States.'" Rowland's resolution went further, instructing members to induce the Federal government to use the preferred term.

In addition to the United Daughters of the Confederacy, Rowland was also an active member of the Virginia Historical Society, the Association for the Preservation of Virginia Antiquities, and the Confederate Memorial Literary Society. She was an honorary member of the Woman's Literary Club of Baltimore.

== List of works ==
=== Articles ===
- "The family of George III." Harper's Magazine. September 1880.
- "Robert Carter of Virginia." Magazine of American History. 1893.
- "The fortunes of the Bourbons." Harper's Magazine. January 1895.
- "Gunston Hall, Virginia." "The Olympian Magazine" 1903.
- "Robert Carter of Virginia: A Revolutionary Sketch." Taylor-Trotwood Magazine. September 1910.
- "GENERAL JOHN THOMSON MASON: An Early Friend of Texas." Volume 011, Number 3, Southwestern Historical Quarterly Online, Page 163 - 198.

=== Books ===
- The Virginia Cavaliers. 1886.
- The Life of George Mason, 1725-1792, Volume 1. G.P. Putnam's Sons, New York. 1892.
- The Life of George Mason, 1725-1792, Volume 2. G.P. Putnam's Sons, New York. 1892.
- The Maryland Delegates to the Albany Congress. Dixie Publishing Company. 1900.
- The Life of Charles Carroll of Carrollton, 1737-1832. Kessinger Publishing, LLC. 2007.

=== Essays and letters ===
- "Three Papers Written for and Read on the Third Historical Evening - Richmond, Virginia, Thursday, November 9, 1911." 1911.
- "Letters from Kate Mason Rowland to Robert Alonzo Brock, 1883-1892."

=== Edited books ===
- The Poems of Frank O. Ticknor, M.D.. J. B. Lippincott & Co. 1879.
- The Real Lincoln. Everett Waddey Company. 1901.
- The Journal of Julia Le Grand, New Orleans, 1862-1863. Everett Waddey Co. 1911.

== Honors and awards ==
In 2010 the Library of Virginia posthumously honored Rowland as one of their "Virginia Women in History" for her contributions to writing.
