= Raspberry Plain =

Historic area in Virginia, US

Coordinates: 39°9′33.6″N 77°32′53.1″W

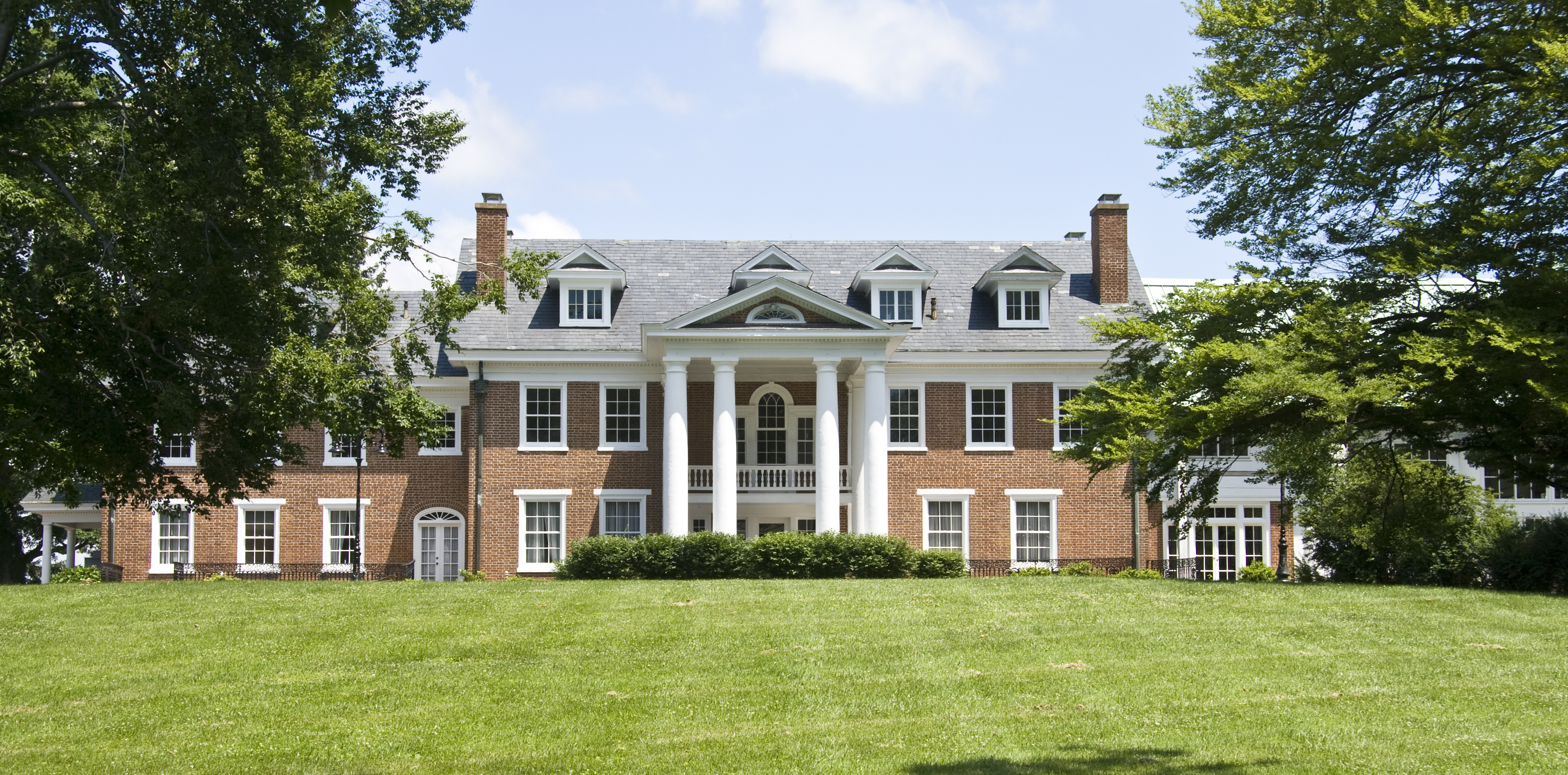
Raspberry Plain

Raspberry Plain is a historic property in Loudoun County, Virginia, near Leesburg. Raspberry Plain became one of the principal Mason family estates of Northern Virginia, and was rebuilt in the early 20th century. It currently operates as an event site, hosting weddings and other special events year round.

== History ==
Thomas Fairfax, 6th Lord Fairfax of Cameron granted the title to the 322-acre (130 ha) Raspberry Plain property to blacksmith Joseph Dixon in 1731. In 1754, the "houses, buildings, orchard, ways and watercourses" of Raspberry Plain were purchased by Loudoun County's first sheriff, Aeneas Campbell. Under Campbell's ownership, the property became the site of Loudoun County's first jailhouse.

George Mason's younger brother Thomson Mason purchased Raspberry Plain from Campbell in 1760. In 1771, Thomson built the mansion at Raspberry Plain. After Thomson's death, his eldest son Stevens Thomson Mason, inherited the house, and later became U.S. senator from Virginia. The Georgian-style mansion at Raspberry Plain was added to throughout the 19th-century, but demolished around 1910. Senator Mason's son, Armistead Thomson Mason, of Selma, was shot and killed by his cousin, John Mason McCarty, in a duel fought at the Bladensburg dueling grounds in Bladensburg, Maryland, in February 1819. McCarty lived at nearby Strawberry Plain, the home and jail of Aeneas Campbell, which had been parceled off from the Raspberry Plain property. That mansion has long since disappeared. In 1910, copper millionaire John Guthrie Hopkins rebuilt Raspberry Plain in the Colonial Revival style. Raspberry Plain, along with several neighboring estates including nearby Mason family estates Temple Hall and Locust Hill, is a contributing property in the 25,000-acre (100 km^{2}) Catoctin Rural Historic District, which was added to the National Register of Historic Places on 31 January 1989.

=== Timeline of mansion creation in the Catoctin Rural Historic District ===
1731 - Thomas Fairfax, 6th Lord Fairfax of Cameron granted the title to the 322-acre Raspberry Plain property to blacksmith Joseph Dixon.

1735 – George Mason, III, died without a will. His estate was left to this eldest son, George Mason IV. His widow, Mrs. Ann Thomson Mason, purchased 10,000 acres in the "wild lands" of Loudoun county for only a few schillings per acre to create an estate for her other two surviving children, Thomson and Mary. This was a profitable investment and the younger two children became wealthier than George IV.

1754 - Strawberry Plain - Aenas Campbell, Loudoun County's first sheriff purchased the property and built the mansion and the first jail in Loudoun on the Raspberry Plain property

1755 – Gunston Hall built by George Mason, IV, one of the Founding Fathers

1760 – The Raspberry Plain property was then purchased by George Mason IV's younger brother, Thomson Mason, who farmed it in corn, rye, oats and buckwheat. The deed is dated May 15, 1760 for 500 pounds current money of Virginia.

1765 – Rockeby - built by Charles Binns, Sr.

1771 - Thomson Mason, brother of George Mason, built the mansion at Raspberry Plain on the site of the current building.

1785 - Upon Thomson's death, the Raspberry Plain estate was deeded to his eldest son Stevens Thomson Mason, U.S. senator from Virginia and Colonel in the Continental Army. The mansion at Raspberry Plain was added to throughout the 19th-century and demolished around 1910.

1790 – Exeter – built by Dr. Wilson Cary and Mary Mason Seldon

1796 – Chestnut Hill - built by Samuel Clapham. It was later enlarged by Thomson Francis Mason, Clapham's son in law.

1800 approximate - Locust Hill – built by John Thomson Mason, son of Thomson Mason

1800 – Belmont - built by Ludwell Lee, son of Richard Henry Lee

1800 – Selma - Thomson Mason's younger son, Armistead Thomson Mason, received that part of the Raspberry Plain tract that came to be known as Selma. Armistead Mason built the first house at Selma between 1800 and 1810.

1804 – Oatlands - built by George Carter

1810 – Temple Hall – built by William Temple Thomson Mason, son of Thomson Mason

1820 – Llangollan – built by Cuthbert Powell

1819 - Armistead Thomson Mason, of Selma, was shot and killed by his cousin, John Mason McCarty of Strawberry Plain, part of the Raspberry estate, in a duel fought at the Bladensburg dueling grounds in Bladensburg, Maryland.

1820 – Foxcroft - built by John Kile

1820 – Oak Hill - built by President James Monroe

1822 – Rockland - built by General George Rust

1825 – Morven Park - built by Governor Thomas Swann of Maryland

1830 – George, John, Peter and Samuel Hoffman of Baltimore purchased the Raspberry Plain estate (then about 250 acres) for $8,500. The estate stayed in the Hoffman family until it was purchased by John Guthrie Hopkins.

1910 – Original mansion at Raspberry Plain destroyed.

1916 – John G. Hopkins purchased Raspberry Plain estate from the Hoffman family and built the current mansion.

1928 – Poplar Springs Manor - built of stone by descendants of Robert "King" Carter on 173 acres in Casanova, Virginia.

1931 – Raspberry Plain was purchased by Mr. and Mrs. William H. Lipscomb. Mr. Lipscomb was the Master of Loudoun Hunt and hosted many of hunt breakfasts at the estate.

1994 – Raspberry Plain was purchased by Brian and Maria Guerra Meehan.

1998 – Antonio Cecchi purchased 24 acres of the original Raspberry Plain estate and Rose Hill Manor. Antonio's father, Giuseppe Cecchi, developed the famous Watergate property in Washington, DC.

2002 - Foxchase Manor - built by Antonio Cecchi

2016 – Raspberry Plain with the remaining 50 acres of the Mason Estate was purchased by Antonio Cecchi of Rose Hill Manor.

2018 – Poplar Springs Manor and the original 173-acre estate purchased by Antonio Cecchi, of Raspberry Plain Manor.

== Current usage ==
Today, Raspberry Plain is operated as a venue for weddings, receptions, corporate events and other special occasions. The Grand Conservatory, which can seat up to 200 guests comfortably, was added to the Mansion House in 1998. Raspberry Plain is open for visits by appointment.

== Architecture ==
Although destroyed in 1910, the 1771 mansion that is depicted in old photographs appears to be a Georgian-style brick dwelling with gambrel-roofed brick wings. It was replaced by the present large Colonial Revival brick mansion around 1910. The 2 1/2-story, Flemish bond brick dwelling possesses a two-story tetrastyle Roman Doric portico with a lunette in the triangular pediment. A row of four pedimented dormers extends across the slate gable roof with overhanging eaves and a wide frieze with dentils encircles the building. Windows are six-over-six double-sash types with louvered shutters and wood lintels. A large central Palladian window sheltered by the portico is the dominant feature of the house. Several tenant houses, farm buildings, gambrel-roofed barns, a bank barn, and stables are scattered around the farm.

== Burial ground ==
The following people are interred in the Mason family burial ground at Raspberry Plain:

- Thomson Mason (14 August 1733–26 February 1785)
- Mary King Barnes Mason (died 21 October 1771), first wife of Thomson Mason and mother of Stevens Thomson Mason
- Stevens Thomson Mason (29 December 1760–9 May 1803), son of Thomson Mason
- Armistead Thomson Mason (4 August 1787–6 February 1819), son of Stevens Thomson Mason
