= Montpelier (Clear Spring, Maryland) =

Late 18th-century Federal-style mansion

Coordinates: 39°40′52″N 77°54′36″W

Montpelier is a late 18th-century Federal-style mansion in Clear Spring in Washington County, Maryland, United States. Montpelier was the residence of John Thomson Mason (15 March 1765–10 December 1824), a prominent American jurist and Attorney General of Maryland in 1806. Montpelier is located at 13448 Broadfording Road in Clear Spring.

== History ==
Montpelier is a two-story brick mansion built around 1770 by Colonel Richard Barnes. In 1800, Colonel Richard and John Barnes were the largest slaveholders in Washington County with 89 enslaved people. In Richard Barnes's 1804 will, he freed all his enslaved people two years after his death. Among these were famous African Methodist Episcopal minister, Thomas Henry.

John Thomson Mason acquired the property and resided there. President Thomas Jefferson visited Montpelier to urge Mason to accept an appointment as United States Attorney General. Mason's son John Thomson Mason, Jr. was born at Montpelier on 9 May 1815. Mason died on 10 December 1824 and was interred at Montpelier, with his wife, where they remain to this day. Much of the Montpelier estate surrounding the mansion remains in historical preservation.
