= William Hill Gray =

American lawyer, planter and politician (1805–1890)

Member of the Virginia House of Delegates from Loudoun County
- In office December 4, 1866 – October 4, 1869 Serving with R.M. Bentley
- Preceded by: Burr P. Noland
- Succeeded by: Isaac D. Budd
- In office December 5, 1842 – December 1, 1844 Serving with John A. Carter, Daniel Miller
- Preceded by: Timothy Taylor
- Succeeded by: John Grubb

Personal details
- Born: November 9, 1805 Loudoun County, Virginia, US
- Died: February 8, 1890 (aged 84) Amherst, Virginia, US
- Resting place: St. James Episcopal Church cemetery, Leesburg, Virginia
- Spouse(s): Francis Ellzey; Ellen Douglas Powell Gray
- Children: 2
- Occupation: planter, lawyer, politician

William Hill Gray (November 9, 1805 – February 8, 1890) was a Virginia lawyer, planter and politician who served two single and widely separated terms in the Virginia House of Delegates, representing his native Loudoun County, and also held local offices in Leesburg as well as Loudoun county.

== Early life and education ==
Born to the former Ann Glass Vance and her husband Robert Gray, who had emigrated from Ireland in 1784 and would die in nearby Winchester, the Frederick county seat around the time this man reached legal age, he received an education appropriate to his class.

== Career ==
Loudoun County voters in 1842 refused to re-elect any of their former representatives in the Virginia House of Delegates and instead elected this man, John A. Carter (who would serve several terms) and Daniel Miller. However, they only re-elected John A. Carter. Gray was elected mayor of Leesburg in late 1843.

In 1840 Gray owned several slaves in Loudoun county. In 1847, not long after his mother's death, Gray purchased the 405 acre Locust Hill plantation in Loudoun County for $12,700. Nearly a decade earlier, in 1836, Gray sent at least his very young daughter Frances to the prestigious (and expensive) school run by Margaret Mercer, who was known for her religious devotion, as well as emphasis on morality and ethics (which included personal opposition to slavery). Other Loudoun slaveholding gentry, the Harrison and Mason families, would also send their daughters to Mercer's school in the next decade. Gray would also pay his slaves in cash and clothing for the work they performed on their day off, as well as corn. Gray purchased Emily, the wife of his male slave George, after she had given birth, and the couple had five more children before 1853, when he sold all "at their own request" to a local farmer for $3200. In 1860, Gray owned nine slaves, including an infant girl, an 85-year-old woman, three women in their 30s, and four men ranging from 19 to 50 years old.

During the Civil War, federal troops occupied Leesburg in the spring of 1862, and raided Locust Hill on September 20–24, 1863. Before these raids, Gray often visited in-laws at Llangollen, Cuthbert Powell's former estate. "Baker's detectives" dug up Gray's cellar looking for bank deposits on October 14, 1863, as well as stole meat, corn and a buggy harness, which prompted Gray two weeks later to move to Leesburg and take possession of "Knox's house." On November 4, "Yankees" took 12 cattle Gray valued at $1000 and three days later took a riding mare. On June 4, 1864, Gray was taken prisoner and sent to Washington D.C., but permitted to return home on parole on August 13. However, he returned to Washington on August 22 and was finally released on September 1, 1864.

Following the American Civil War, on June 1, 1865, Gray was selected as one of Loudoun County's 27 gentleman justices of the peace (who jointly ruled the county in that era), and his fellows elected him as their president on July 10, 1865, with the remaining new officials being Charles P. Janney as county clerk, Samuel C. Luckett as sheriff, William B. Downey as Commonwealth attorney and Samuel Ball as commissioner of revenue. The following day, Gray requested George K. Fox Jr., the county court's clerk, to return the records entrusted to him to the county. On August 3, 1865, Gray traveled to Richmond to retrieve bank assets, and on September 5 and 6, 1865 traveled to Washington to release his land.

Later that year, Gray again became one of Loudoun County's two representatives in the Virginia House of Delegates, alongside R.M. Bentley (who had also served a single term 1859–1861, as well as being another of the 27 postwar gentlemen justices), but again was not re-elected. During that second legislative stint, on November 28, 1865, Gray sold Locust Hill and three other parcels for the benefit of creditors, and on May 1, 1868, that foreclosure trustee conveyed Locust Hill to R. Beverley Clark. He lived many of his final years in the household of his daughter Frances, and her wealthy farmer husband, William Beverley.

== Personal life and distinguishing other men of the same name ==
Gray married twice, first to Francis Ellzey. His wife was likely related to former state senator William Ellzey (d. 1796 who had married Alice Blackburn the sister of Col. Thomas Blackburn) and his son of the same name (d. 1835, who as a youth had fought at the siege of Yorktown and in 1799 married Frances Hill Westwood) Gray's surviving daughter by this marriage was named Francis Westwood Gray (1833–1880). She married planter William Beverley (1829–1879) of nearby Fauquier county, and cared for her father in his final years. In November 1836, Gray married Ellen Douglas Powell (1812–1862), one of the daughters of former congressman Cuthbert Powell and his wife Catherine Simms (whose father Charles Simms was a friend of George Washington and Alexandria's mayor during the War of 1812). Three of her brothers (his brothers in law) survived the conflict. Gray clearly worked with Yale-educated lawyer Charles Leven Powell in Fauquier and Loudoun Counties before the Civil War (in which Powell lost both sons who enlisted in the Confederate army, one at each of the battles at Bull Run) and afterward returned to Alexandria and operated a successful school. Gray gained a son from that second marriage, Rev. Arthur Powell Gray (1853–1921) who became an Episcopal priest (as would his son of the same name) and served in various parishes in the Commonwealth before dying in Lawrenceville in Brunswick County. Neither of Gray's daughters from that second marriage reached adulthood.

Two other Virginia men of that era and geographic area shared the same names, but their middle "H" reflects different names. One was born in 1854 in Loudoun County and died in 1894 and unlike this man had an obituary in a Loudoun newspaper. That man's father was Robert Waterman Gray (d.1876) and his mother Elizabeth Bentley (d. 1885) and both that man's sister Harriet Claggett (1842–1911) and his brother Robert Bentley Gray (1851–1929) survived the conflict. Although they are buried in the same cemetery, they are likely not related, since Robert Waterman Gray was born in Rockingham County and this man's father in Ireland. The other man of similar name was Scots-Irish and moved to nearby Fauquier County after the conflict. William Hamilton Gray III (1784–1867) was the eldest surviving son of William Hamilton Gray (1746–1826) of Patrick County, Virginia (far to the southwest in the Appalachian mountains) and his wife Mary Ann Powell (1760–1826). That William H. Gray, who became a Confederate soldier and prisoner of war, may have lived in Marion County, Virginia in 1850 but moved to the northern end of the Shenandoah Valley before the conflict, living in Warren County in 1860 and in Fauquier County (perhaps about 30 miles south of the Loudoun border) in the 1870 and 1880 censuses.

== Death and legacy ==
Gray died at his son's residence in Amherst County on February 8, 1890. His remains were reburied at the cemetery of St. James Episcopal Church in Leesburg. His gravestone (and that of Robert Waterman Gray) is now far closer to the new Loudoun County courthouse than the now-historic (but rebuilt in 1895) Episcopal church His son, who became an Episcopal priest would urge his own son, also Rev. Arthur P. Gray, an athlete who wanted to become a missionary in Japan following his graduation from the University of Virginia, to instead start his missionary career near home, so Arthur P. Gray Jr. founded the Bear Mountain Indian Mission School for 325 souls above Amherst in 1908 before leaving it in the care of the daughter of the dean of the Alexandria Theological Seminary in 1910, and she other deaconesses became the primary caretakers for the next six decades. Rev. A.P. Gray Jr. continued his ministry in Virginia, caring for his father who died in Lawrenceville in Brunswick County, Virginia during his ministry there. Rev. A.P. Gray Jr later became active in preservation efforts in West Point, Virginia before his own death in 1938. The Virginia Historical Society has the family's papers, including a diary and records of Locust Hill farm.
