= Mattawoman (plantation) =

Human settlement in Maryland, United States of America

Coordinates: 38°33′20″N 77°11′18″W

Mattawoman was an 18th-century plantation on Mattawoman Creek in Charles County, Maryland, United States.

== History ==
Mattawoman was the country estate of Colonel William Eilbeck, a wealthy planter and merchant, and his wife Sarah Edgar. On 4 April 1750, Colonel Eilbeck's only child, 16-year-old Ann, married George Mason at Mattawoman. Mason's father's plantation, where Mason spent several years of his childhood, adjoined Mattawoman.

George Mason bequeathed Mattawoman and all his lands upon Chicamuxen and Mattawoman creeks to his son William Mason. At age 23 in 1780, Mason's eldest son George Mason V inherited Mattawoman from his maternal grandmother, Sarah Eilbeck. Mason inherited his father's properties upon his death in 1792.

== Events ==
- John Mason (4 April 1766–19 March 1849), son of George Mason and Ann Eilbeck, was born at Mattawoman.
- George Mason of Hollin Hall (11 November 1797–25 March 1870), son of William Mason and Ann Stuart, was born at Mattawoman.
- Mary Elizabeth Mason (1810–2 February 1885), daughter of William Mason and Ann Stuart, married Enoch Mason Jr. on 5 May 1831 at Mattawoman.
- Edgar Eilbeck Mason (1807–8 January 1835), son of William Mason and Ann Stuart, died at Mattawoman.
- William Mason (22 October 1757–7 February 1818), son of George Mason and Ann Eilbeck, died at Mattawoman.
