= John Thomson Mason (1787–1850) =

American lawyer

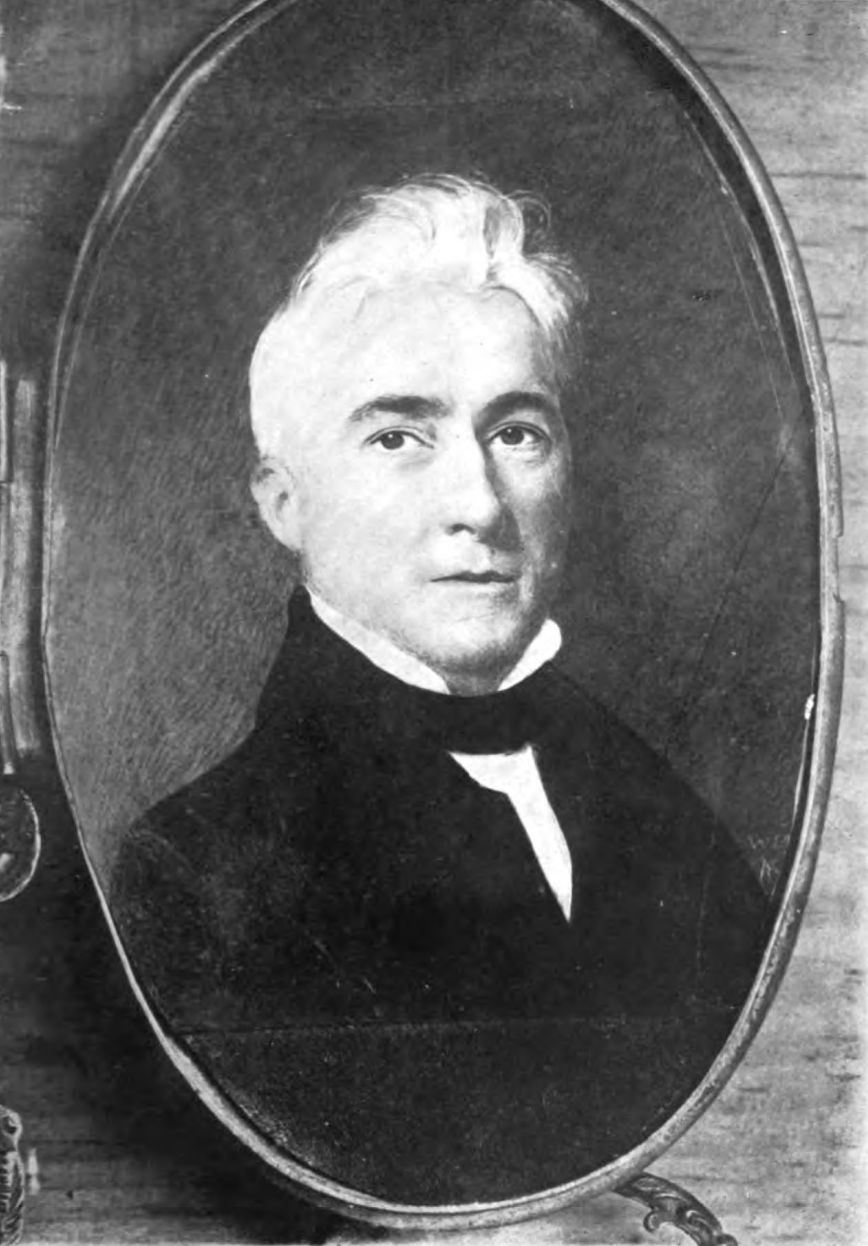
- Born: John Thomson Mason; January 8, 1787; Raspberry Plain plantation, Leesburg, Virginia
- Died: April 17, 1850 (aged 63); Tremont House, Galveston, Texas
- Education: College of William and Mary
- Occupations: lawyer, United States marshal, Secretary of Michigan Territory, land agent
- Spouses: Elizabeth Baker Moir; Frances Magruder
- Children: At least 11, including Stevens T. Mason
- Parent(s): Stevens Thomson Mason; Mary Elizabeth Armistead
- Relatives: grandnephew of George Mason IV

John Thomson Mason (January 8, 1787 – April 17, 1850) was an American lawyer, United States marshal, Secretary of Michigan Territory from 1830 through 1831, land agent, and an important figure in the Texas Revolution.

== Early life and education ==
Mason was born on January 8, 1787, at Raspberry Plain near Leesburg in Loudoun County, Virginia. He was eldest child and eldest son of Stevens Thomson Mason, Republican U.S. Senator from Virginia, and his wife Mary Elizabeth Armistead.

Mason was educated at Charlotte Hall Military Academy in Charlotte Hall, St. Mary's County, Maryland, and at the College of William & Mary in Williamsburg, Virginia.

== Political appointee ==
In 1812, Mason left his family stronghold of Northern Virginia to attempt making his own fortunes in Lexington, Kentucky. In 1817, President James Monroe appointed Mason United States marshal. Mason was appointed Secretary of Michigan Territory and superintendent of Indian affairs in 1830 by President Andrew Jackson. He held those appointments until 1831, when President Jackson sent Mason on a mission to Mexico. To fill his post as Secretary of Michigan Territory, President Jackson appointed Mason's son Stevens. Stevens later became the first Governor of Michigan on October 6, 1835.

== Land agent and revolutionary ==
Afterwards, Mason resided principally in New York City and Washington, D.C. In 1830, Mason became a scripholder for the Galveston Bay and Texas Land Company in New York. The land company's purpose was to assume the land holdings of Texas empresarios Lorenzo de Zavala, David G. Burnet, and Joseph Vehlein which comprised approximately 20 million acres (81,000 km^{2}). Mason became a confidential land agent for the land company in 1831. While in Mexico City on the land company's behalf, Mason discovered that the Law of April 6, 1830, prevented the transfer of Mexican land to foreign companies. On a subsequent trip to Mexico City in 1833, Mason was able to secure a repeal of the law's stipulation that forbade colonization in Mexico from the United States. Once he accomplished this, Mason resigned from the land company to promote his personal Texas landholdings. Mason continued to expand his landholdings by purchasing 300 leagues from the Mexican government and 100 leagues from individual landholders. To manage his land holdings, Mason employed John Charles Leplicher in New York City as his land office clerk and Archibald Hotchkiss as his attorney.

Mason's prosperous land business was soon compromised when his large land grants were cancelled by the Provisional government of Texas. The revolutionary government repudiated the sales of land made in 1834 by the Mexican state of Coahuila y Tejas, going so far as to name Mason's contract as annulled by them in the First Texan Constitution. His attorney Leplicher then filed suit against Mason in Nacogdoches on February 16, 1835, for alleged unpaid salary. Mason was made commandant of the Nacogdoches District by the Committee of Vigilance and Safety on April 11, 1836, only to resign twelve days later. Mason remained in Nacogdoches for most of the duration of the Texas Revolution. Mason continued to support the Texas Revolution by paying $1,000 for the schooner Liberty for the Texas Navy and advancing $500 for the expenses of the schooner Brutus. On March 2, 1836, the Republic of Texas declared its independence and organized a government. The following year, Mason attended a session of Congress of the Republic of Texas in Houston, the capital of Texas.

== Later life ==
After the Texas Revolution, Mason moved to New York, but returned to Texas multiple times during the 1840s. He traveled to Texas for the last time in 1849. Mason died of cholera on May 3, 1850, at Tremont House in Galveston.

== Marriages and children ==
Mason married Elizabeth Baker Moir in Williamsburg, Virginia, on February 9, 1809. The couple had at least eleven children:

- Mary Elizabeth Mason (December 18, 1809 – 1822)
- Stevens Thomson Mason (October 27, 1811 – January 5, 1843)
- Armistead Thomson Mason (June 13, 1813 – July 2, 1813)
- Armistead Thomson Mason (August 13, 1814 – November 13, 1814)
- Emily Virginia Mason (October 15, 1815 – February 16, 1909)
- Catherine Armistead Mason Rowland (February 23, 1818 – 1884)
- Laura Ann Thomson Mason Chilton (October 5, 1821 – March 2, 1911)
- Theodoshia Howard Mason (December 9, 1822 – January 17, 1834)
- Cornelia Madison Mason (January 25, 1825 – August 2, 1831)
- Mary Elizabeth Mason (January 18, 1828 – October 29, 1833)
- Louisa Westwood Mason (September 24, 1829 – October 11, 1829)

Mason married for a second time to Frances Magruder in Baltimore, Maryland, on June 29, 1845.

== Relations ==
John Thomson Mason was the grandnephew of George Mason (1725–1792); grandson of Thomson Mason (1733–1785); son of Mary Elizabeth "Polly" Armistead Mason (1760–1825) and Stevens Thomson Mason (1760–1803); nephew of John Thomson Mason (1765–1824); second cousin of Thomson Francis Mason (1785–1838) and James Murray Mason (1798–1871); brother-in-law of William Taylor Barry (1784–1835); brother of Armistead Thomson Mason (1787–1819); uncle of Stevens Thomson Mason (1811–1843); and first cousin of John Thomson Mason, Jr. (1815–1873).

== Ancestry ==
Ancestors of John Thomson Mason (1787–1850)

16. George Mason II
8. George Mason III
17. Mary Fowke
4. Thomson Mason
18. Stevens Thomson
9. Ann Stevens Thomson
19. Dorothea Taunton
2. Stevens Thomson Mason
20. Thomas Barnes
10. Abraham Barnes
5. Mary King Barnes
22. Robert King
11. Mary King
23. Priscilla Covington
1. John Thomson Mason
24. Anthony Armistead
12. Robert Armistead
25. Hannah Ellyson
6. Robert Armistead
26. Thomas Nutting
13. Catherine Nutting
27. Elizabeth Booth
3. Mary Elizabeth Armistead
28. Worlich Westwood
14. William Westwood
29. Elizabeth Naylor
7. Mary Westwood
30. Thomas Tabb
15. Mary Tabb
31. Mary Hayward
