= Stevens Thomson Mason (Virginia politician) =

American politician (1760–1803)

- In office November 18, 1794 – May 10, 1803
- Preceded by: James Monroe
- Succeeded by: John Taylor

Member of the Virginia House of Delegates from Loudoun County
- In office 1794 Serving with Thomas Swann
- Preceded by: Albert Russell
- Succeeded by: William Ellzey Jr.

Member of the Virginia Senate from Loudoun and Fauquier Counties
- In office 1787–1791
- Preceded by: William Ellzey
- Succeeded by: Francis Peyton

Member of the Virginia House of Delegates from Loudoun County
- In office 1783–1784 Serving with John Carter
- Preceded by: Francis Peyton
- Succeeded by: Francis Peyton

Personal details
- Born: December 29, 1760 Chopawamsic (plantation), Stafford County, Colony of Virginia
- Died: May 10, 1803 (aged 42) Philadelphia, Pennsylvania
- Party: Anti-Administration Party; Democratic-Republican Party
- Spouse: Mary Elizabeth Armistead
- Children: John Thomson Mason; Armistead Thomson Mason; Stevens Thomson Mason; Mary Thomson Mason; Emily Rutger Mason; Catherine Mason
- Education: College of William & Mary
- Occupation: lawyer

Colonel Stevens Thomson Mason (December 29, 1760 – May 10, 1803) was an American lawyer, military officer and planter who served in the Continental Army during the Revolutionary War. Mason was also a delegate in the Virginia General Assembly and a Republican U.S. Senator from 1794 to 1803.

== Early and family life ==
Mason was born to Thomson Mason (1733–1785); and his wife at Chopawamsic in Stafford County, Virginia. His ancestors had emigrated generations earlier and owned thousands of acres of land (some developed and farmed by enslaved labor) in Maryland and Virginia. His maternal great grandfather was an attorney and significant landowner in Maryland, and (his grandmother) Ann Eilbeck Mason was his only heir, and determined to provide for her younger sons (including Thomson Mason) by securing land and slaves. His uncle George Mason IV had inherited the Mason family estates by primogeniture in 1735 (though then underage, he took control upon reaching legal majority). His grandmother invested in real estate being developed along the Potomac River in Loudoun County, which by the time of her death may have exceeded the lands his uncle inherited by primogeniture. After education by private tutors as a boy, he and his brothers also had access to the library of his lawyer uncle John Mercer near Fredericksburg. Stevens T. Mason then traveled to Williamsburg, Virginia for higher education at the College of William & Mary, concentrating in legal studies.

== Officer, lawyer and planter ==
Admitted to the Virginia bar, Mason began a private legal practice in Dumfries, Virginia in Prince William County. His uncle George Mason was one of his clients until his death in 1792. Especially after his father's 1785 death at the family's Raspberry Plain plantation in what had become Loudoun County, Mason operated farms using enslaved labor, as would his descendants. In the 1787 Virginia tax census, Stevens T. Mason owned 33 slaves over 16 years of age, as well as 38 slaves under age 18, 28 horses, 76 cattle, 4 wheeled vehicles and a stud horse.

During the American Revolutionary War, as his uncle George served in the Virginia General Assembly and drafted the Virginia Declaration of Rights as well as the first Virginia constitution and state seal, Stevens Mason served as an officer in the Continental Army and in the Virginia militia. By the Battle of Yorktown, he was a brigadier general in the Virginia militia as well as an aide to General George Washington.

== Political career ==
Following the war, Loudoun County voters elected him as one of their (part-time) representatives in the Virginia State House of Delegates in 1783, and he served alongside veteran John Carter, although neither won re-election the following year. In 1787 he won election to the Virginia State Senate representing Loudoun and nearby Fauquier Counties (thus serving in 4 General Assembly sessions), but failed to win re-election in 1791, being replaced by veteran politician Francis Peyton. Meanwhile Stevens Thomson Mason also won election (alongside Levin Powell) as Loudoun County's delegate to the Virginia Ratification Convention in 1788, during which his uncle (one of Stafford County's representatives) unsuccessfully fought against ratification, but ultimately caused Virginia's congressional delegates to propose the Bill of Rights modeled on his Virginia Declaration of Rights and which was later approved by Congress and the states as a series of ten Constitutional amendments. Less than two years following his uncle's death, in 1794, Loudoun County voters returned Stevens Thomson Mason to the Virginia House of Delegates. Fellow legislators elected him to the United States Senate to fill the vacancy caused by the resignation of James Monroe. Stevens Thomson Mason won re-election in 1797 and again in 1803, and thus served from 18 November 1794, until his death in Philadelphia, Pennsylvania.

While in the Senate Mason handed a copy of the secret Jay Treaty to Pierre Adét, French minister to the United States. The senator along with Senator Pierce Butler leaked the document to the American press. Since his country was at war with Great Britain and hated the idea of a treaty of “amity” between it and the United States, Adét gave the document to Benjamin Bache, publisher of The Aurora — a newspaper — with the hope of raising just the sort of public outcry that ensued—and even, perhaps, of blocking ratification of the treaty.

Mason was the only senator to vote against the confirmation of Oliver Ellsworth as the chief justice of the Supreme Court.

== Death and legacy ==
He is interred in the family burying ground at Raspberry Plain in Loudoun County, Virginia.

== Marriage and children ==
Mason married Mary Elizabeth Armistead on May 1, 1783. The couple had six children:

- John Thomson Mason (January 8, 1787 – April 17, 1850)
- Armistead Thomson Mason (1787 – February 6, 1819)
- Stevens Thomson Mason (1789 – 17 November 1815)
- Mary Thomson Mason (1791–1813)
- Emily Rutger Mason (1793–1837)
- Catherine Mason (born 1795)

== Relations ==
Brother of John Thomson Mason (1765–1824); half-brother of William Temple Thomson Mason (1782–1862); first cousin of George Mason V (1753–1796); first cousin once removed of Thomson Francis Mason (1785–1838), George Mason VI (1786–1834), Richard Barnes Mason (1797–1850), and James Murray Mason (1798–1871); father of Armistead Thomson Mason (1787–1819) and John Thomson Mason (1787–1850); uncle of John Thomson Mason Jr. (1815–1873); and grandfather of Stevens Thomson Mason (1811–1843), first governor of Michigan. His great granddaughter Kate Mason Rowland would be one of the founding members of the Daughters of the Confederacy and also write a two-volume biography of George Mason IV.

== See also ==
- List of members of the United States Congress who died in office (1790–1899)

U.S. Senate
Preceded by James Monroe	U.S. senator (Class 1) from Virginia; 18 November 1794 – 10 May 1803; Served alongside: Henry Tazewell, Wilson C. Nicholas	Succeeded by John Taylor
