= John Thomson Mason Jr. =

American judge

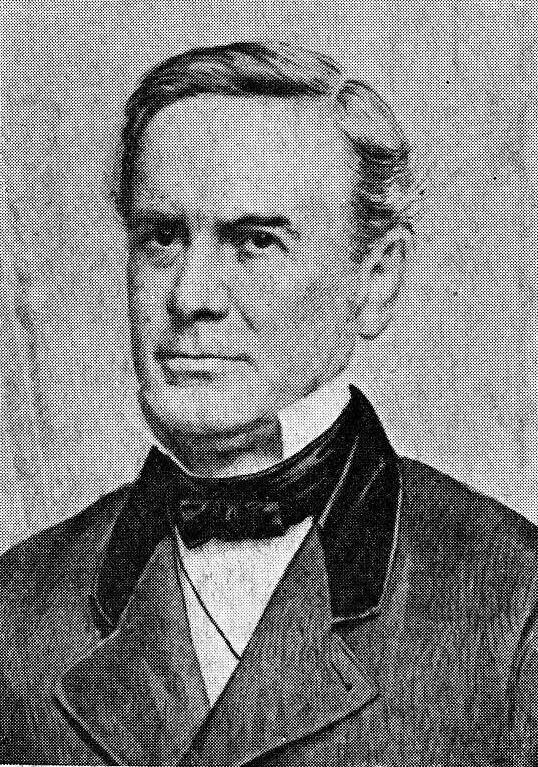

Member of the U.S. House of Representatives from Maryland's 6th district
- In office March 4, 1841 – March 3, 1843
- Preceded by: Francis Thomas
- Succeeded by: Thomas Ara Spence

24th Secretary of State of Maryland
- In office 1872–1873
- Governor: William Pinkney Whyte
- Preceded by: Richard C. Hollyday
- Succeeded by: Richard C. Hollyday

Member of Maryland House of Delegates
- In office 1838–1839

Personal details
- Born: May 9, 1815 Montpelier, Clear Spring, Maryland
- Died: March 28, 1873 (aged 57) Elkton, Maryland
- Party: Democratic
- Spouse: Margaret Augusta Cowan
- Children: 4
- Education: Princeton University
- Occupation: Attorney

John Thomson Mason Jr. (May 9, 1815 – March 28, 1873) was a U.S. Congressman from Maryland, representing the sixth district from 1841 to 1843.

== Early life and education ==
Born at the Montpelier estate near Hagerstown, Maryland, Mason was educated by a private tutor and graduated from Princeton College in 1836. He studied law, was admitted to the bar, and commenced practice in Hagerstown in 1838.

== Political career ==
Mason later served as a member of the Maryland House of Delegates in 1838 and 1839, and was elected as a Democrat to the Twenty-seventh Congress, serving from March 4, 1841 to March 3, 1843. He tried returning to Congress as the Representative for Maryland's 2nd district in 1844, but lost to Whig candidate Francis Brengle by a vote of 5,694 to 6,116.

He was a judge of the Maryland Court of Appeals from 1851 to 1857, and afterwards a collector of customs at Baltimore, Maryland, from 1857 to 1861. He moved to Annapolis, Maryland, and served as Secretary of State of Maryland from 1872 until his death in 1873.

== Death and interment ==
Mason died on March 28, 1873, in Elkton, Maryland at age 57. He is interred in Rose Hill Cemetery (Maryland) in Hagerstown, Maryland.

== Marriage and children ==
Mason married Margaret Augusta Cowan in Alleghany City, Pennsylvania on December 14, 1842. The couple had four children:

- Louise Gilmer Mason Terry (February 12, 1844–September 26, 1921)
- William Temple Thomson Mason (December 12, 1845–April 5, 1847)
- Elizabeth Mason Porter (born March 28, 1848)
- John Thomson Mason (born January 3, 1850)

== Relations ==
John Thomson Mason Jr. was a grandnephew of George Mason (1725–1792); grandson of Thomson Mason (1733–1785); nephew of Stevens Thomson Mason (1760–1803); son of John Thomson Mason (1765–1824) and Elizabeth Beltzhoover Mason (1781–1836); second cousin of Thomson Francis Mason (1785–1838); first cousin of Armistead Thomson Mason (1787–1819), John Thomson Mason (1787–1850), and James Murray Mason (1798–1871); and first cousin once removed of Stevens Thomson Mason (1811–1843).

U.S. House of Representatives
| Preceded by Francis Thomas | U.S. Congressman from the 6th district of Maryland; 1841–1843 | Succeeded by Thomas A. Spence |
Political offices
| Preceded by Richard C. Hollyday | Secretary of State of Maryland; 1872–1873 | Succeeded by Richard C. Hollyday |
