= John Thomson Mason =

American lawyer (1765-1824)

4th Attorney General of Maryland
- In office 1806–1806
- Governor: Robert Bowie
- Preceded by: William Pinkney
- Succeeded by: John Johnson Sr.

Personal details
- Born: 15 March 1765 Chopawamsic, Stafford County, Colony of Virginia
- Died: 10 December 1824 (aged 59)
- Spouse: Elizabeth Beltzhoover
- Children: 7, including John Thomson Mason Jr.
- Profession: Attorney

John Thomson Mason (15 March 1765 – 10 December 1824) was an American lawyer and attorney general of Maryland in 1806.

== Early life ==
Mason was born on 15 March 1765 at Chopawamsic in Stafford County, Virginia. He was the third child and youngest son of Thomson Mason and his wife Mary King Barnes.

== Early career ==
Mason operated a plantation in what was then Washington County, Maryland near Elizabethtown (now Hagerstown using enslaved labor.

Admitted to the Maryland bar, he attained high rank, but twice declined the office of United States Attorney General when it was offered by Presidents Thomas Jefferson and James Madison. He then served as Attorney General of Maryland in 1806. He was also one of six judges appointed to a newly restructured court of appeals by Governor Robert Bowie on 19 January 1806, but declined the appointment. Mason ran for one of Maryland's seats in the United States Senate in 1816, but lost.

== Marriages and children ==
Elizabeth Beltzhoover Mason, painted by Gilbert Stuart

Mason married Elizabeth Beltzhoover in 1797. He and Elizabeth had seven children:

- Mary Barnes Mason Winter (c. 1800–11 May 1844)
- Elizabeth Ann Armistead Thomson Mason Wharton (4 April 1803–20 January 1857)
- Abram Barnes Mason Barnes (21 October 1807–10 April 1863)
- Melchior Beltzhoover Mason (born 3 October 1812)
- John Thomson Mason, Jr. (9 May 1815–28 March 1873)
- Thomson Mason (15 July 1818–1848)
- Virginia Wallace Mason (16 April 1820–6 October 1858)

== Later life ==
Mason died on 10 December 1824 at the age of 59. Mason was interred at his Montpelier estate in Clear Spring, Maryland.

== Relations ==
John Thomson Mason was a nephew of George Mason (1725–1792); son of Thomson Mason (1733–1785); brother of Stevens Thomson Mason (1760–1803); half-brother of William Temple Thomson Mason (1782–1862); first cousin of George Mason V (1753–1796); first cousin once removed of Thomson Francis Mason (1785–1838), George Mason VI (1786–1834), Richard Barnes Mason (1797–1850), and James Murray Mason (1798–1871); uncle of Armistead Thomson Mason (1787–1819) and John Thomson Mason (1787–1850); father of John Thomson Mason Jr. (1815–1873); and great uncle of Stevens Thomson Mason (1811–1843).

Legal offices
Preceded by William Pinkney	Attorney General of Maryland; 1806	Succeeded by John Johnson Sr.
