= Armistead Thomson Mason =

American politician (1787–1819)

Armistead Mason
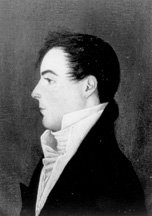

United States Senator from Virginia
- In office January 3, 1816 – March 3, 1817
- Preceded by: William Giles
- Succeeded by: John Eppes

Personal details
- Born: Armistead Thomson Mason; August 4, 1787 Armisteads, Virginia, U.S.
- Died: February 6, 1819 (aged 31) Bladensburg, Maryland, U.S.
- Party: Democratic-Republican
- Spouse: Charlotte Taylor
- Children: 1
- Relatives: Stevens Mason (father)
- Education: College of William & Mary (BA)

Armistead Thomson Mason (August 4, 1787 – February 6, 1819) was a U.S. Senator from Virginia from 1816 to 1817. Mason was also the second-youngest person to ever serve in the US Senate, at the age of 28 and 5 months, even though the age requirement for the US Senate in the constitution is 30 years old. He was the son of Stevens Thomson Mason.

== Early life and education ==
He was born at Armisteads in Louisa County, Virginia, graduated from the College of William & Mary in 1807 and engaged in agricultural pursuits until he became colonel of Virginia Volunteers in the War of 1812 and subsequently brigadier general of Virginia Militia.

== Political career ==
He was elected as a Republican to the United States Senate to fill the vacancy caused by the resignation of William Branch Giles, despite being constitutionally underage for the office. Mason served from January 3, 1816, to March 3, 1817. He then moved to Loudoun County, Virginia where he was an unsuccessful candidate for election to the Fifteenth Congress (1817). It was a bitter campaign that gave rise to several duels: Mason himself was later killed in a duel with his second cousin, John Mason McCarty, at Bladensburg Duelling Field, Maryland, as a result of this campaign. He is buried in the churchyard of the Episcopal Church at Leesburg, Virginia.

== Marriage and children ==
Mason married on 1 May 1817 to Charlotte Eliza Taylor (died 1846) at Dr. Charles Cocke's in Albemarle County, Virginia. The couple had one son:

- Stevens Thomson Mason (1819–14 June 1847)

== Relations ==
Armistead Thomson Mason was the grandnephew of George Mason (1725–1792); grandson of Thomson Mason (1733–1785); son of Mary Elizabeth "Polly" Armistead Mason (1760–1825) and Stevens Thomson Mason (1760–1803); nephew of John Thomson Mason (1765–1824); second cousin of Thomson Francis Mason (1785–1838) and James Murray Mason (1798–1871); brother-in-law of William Taylor Barry (1784–1835); brother of John Thomson Mason (1787–1850); uncle of Stevens Thomson Mason (1811–1843); and first cousin of John Thomson Mason, Jr. (1815–1873).

== Ancestry ==
Ancestors of Armistead Thomson Mason

8. George Mason III
4. Thomson Mason
9. Ann Stevens Thomson
2. Stevens Thomson Mason
10. Abraham Barnes
5. Mary King Barnes
11. Mary King
1. Armistead Thomson Mason
12. Robert Armistead
6. Robert Armistead
13. Catherine Nutting
3. Mary Elizabeth Armistead
14. William Westwood
7. Mary Westwood
15. Mary Tabb

U.S. Senate
Preceded by William Giles	U.S. Senator (Class 2) from Virginia; 1816–1817; Served alongside: James Barbour	Succeeded by John Eppes
New office	Chair of the Senate District of Columbia Committee; 1816–1817	Succeeded by Robert Henry Goldsborough
