= Stevens T. Mason =

First governor of Michigan

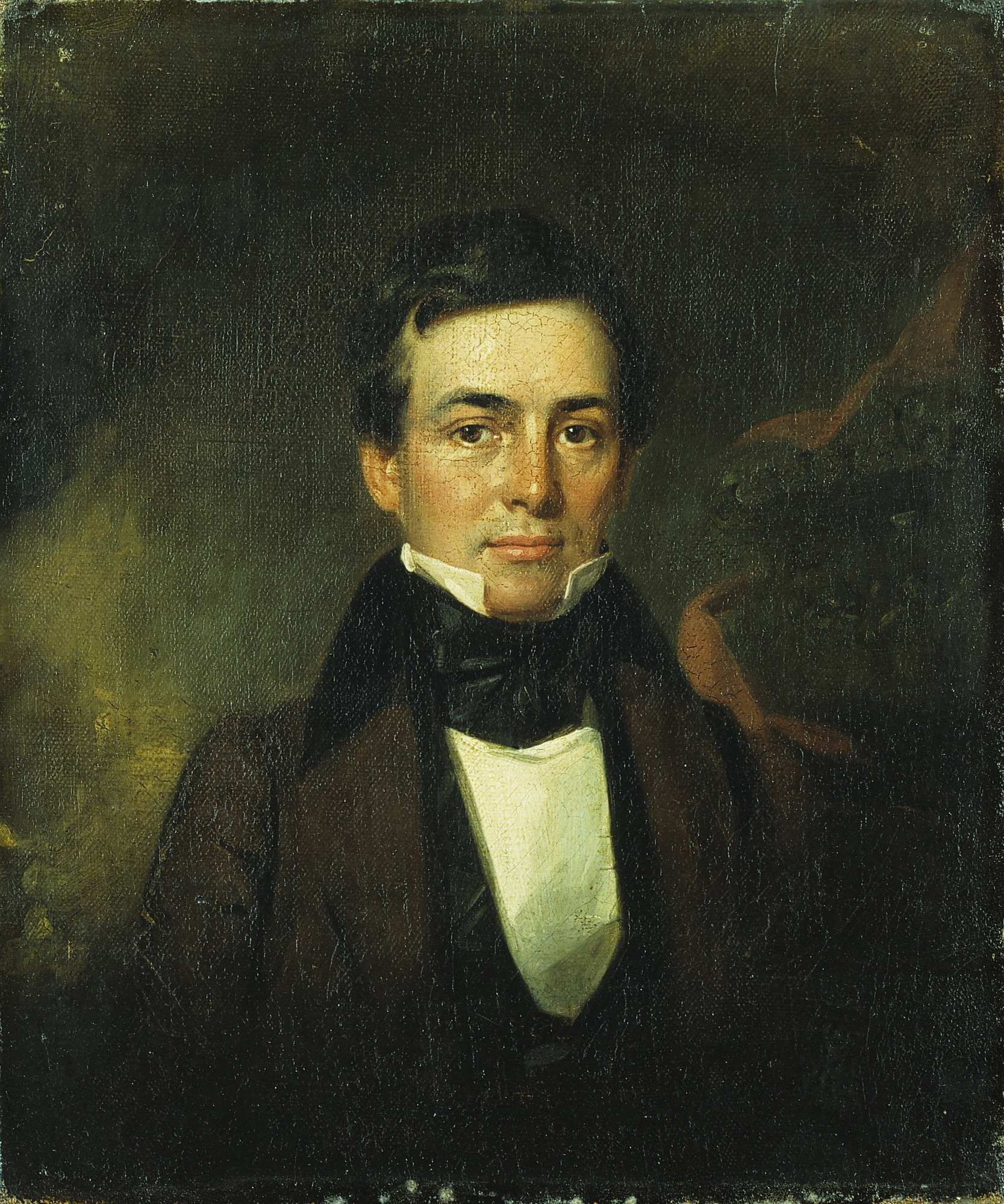

1st Governor of Michigan
- In office November 3, 1835 – January 7, 1840
- Lieutenant: Edward Mundy
- Preceded by: John S. Horner as Territorial Governor
- Succeeded by: William Woodbridge

Acting governor of the Territory of Michigan
- In office July 6, 1834 – September 19, 1835
- Preceded by: George B. Porter; Territorial Governor
- Succeeded by: John S. Horner; Territorial Governor

Personal details
- Born: October 27, 1811 Leesburg, Virginia
- Died: January 4, 1843 (aged 31) New York City, New York
- Party: Democratic
- Spouse: Julia Phelps
- Children: 3
- Nickname: The Boy Governor

Stevens Thomson Mason (October 27, 1811 – January 4, 1843) was an American politician who served as the first governor of Michigan from 1835 to 1840. Coming to political prominence at an early age, Mason was appointed his territory's acting territorial secretary by Andrew Jackson at age 19, becoming the acting territorial governor soon thereafter in 1834 at age 22. As territorial governor, Mason was instrumental in guiding Michigan to statehood, which was secured in 1837. A member of the Democratic Party, he was elected as Michigan's first state governor in 1835, where he served until 1840. Elected at 23 and taking office at 24, Mason was and remains the youngest state governor in American history.

== Early life in Virginia and Kentucky ==
Mason was born near Leesburg in Loudoun County, Virginia, into a politically powerful family. His great-grandfather, Thomson Mason (1733–1785), was chief justice of the Virginia Supreme Court and younger brother of George Mason (1725–1792), who took part in the Constitutional Convention. His grandfather, Stevens Thomson Mason (1760–1803), was a U.S. Senator from Virginia from 1794 until his death. His uncle, Armistead Thomson Mason (1787–1819), was also a U.S. senator from Virginia. In addition, his uncles by marriage, Benjamin Howard (1760–1814) and William Taylor Barry (1784–1835), both served in the Kentucky House of Representatives and were U.S. Representatives from Kentucky. Howard was also Governor of the Louisiana (Missouri) Territory (1810–1812) and the Missouri Territory (1812–1813). Barry served as a U.S. senator from Kentucky (1814–1816), then had a long career in a number of Kentucky government positions, and ultimately became U.S. Postmaster General (1829–1835).

In 1812, Mason's father, John Thomson Mason (1787–1850), left the Mason family stronghold in Virginia to attempt to make his own fortune in Lexington, Kentucky. In 1817, President James Monroe appointed the elder Mason United States marshal. While his business ventures were a complete failure and the family became nearly broke in the 1820s, he was a lawyer and land agent from an influential family, and went on to become an important figure in the Texas Revolution.

== Life and politics in Michigan Territory ==
John Mason was appointed secretary of the Michigan Territory and superintendent of Indian affairs in 1830 by President Andrew Jackson. Young Stevens was more politically savvy than his father and helped to protect him from schemes launched by anti-Jackson forces. This gained him notice from the territorial governor, Lewis Cass. In 1831, President Jackson sent the elder Mason on a mission to Mexico and named Stevens to replace his father as secretary, at the age of 19 before he could even vote. At about the same time, Governor Cass became Jackson's Secretary of War. As the territorial secretary traditionally served as acting governor, young Mason held that role until George Bryan Porter, who was named to replace Cass in August 1831, arrived in Detroit in 1832. As it turned out, Porter was frequently absent and Mason was, for all practical purposes, the acting governor during this time, leading to his nickname of the "Boy Governor". Porter died of cholera in Detroit in 1834, and so Mason was once again acting governor of the Michigan Territory.

Mason was influential in petitioning for Michigan statehood. When the first petition in 1832 was not acted upon by the U.S. Congress, Mason commissioned a territorial census. When the census was completed in 1834, it determined that 85,856 people lived in the lower peninsula, more than the 60,000 required for statehood by the Northwest Ordinance of 1787. A dispute over a strip of land, the Toledo Strip, claimed by both Michigan and Ohio led to the Toledo War. President Jackson appointed Benjamin Chew Howard of Baltimore and Richard Rush of Philadelphia to arbitrate the dispute, but Mason was not satisfied with the proposal and refused to back down. Not wanting to alienate his political support in Ohio, President Jackson removed Mason as territorial secretary in August 1835 and appointed John S. ("Little Jack") Horner as his replacement.

== First governor of the state of Michigan ==
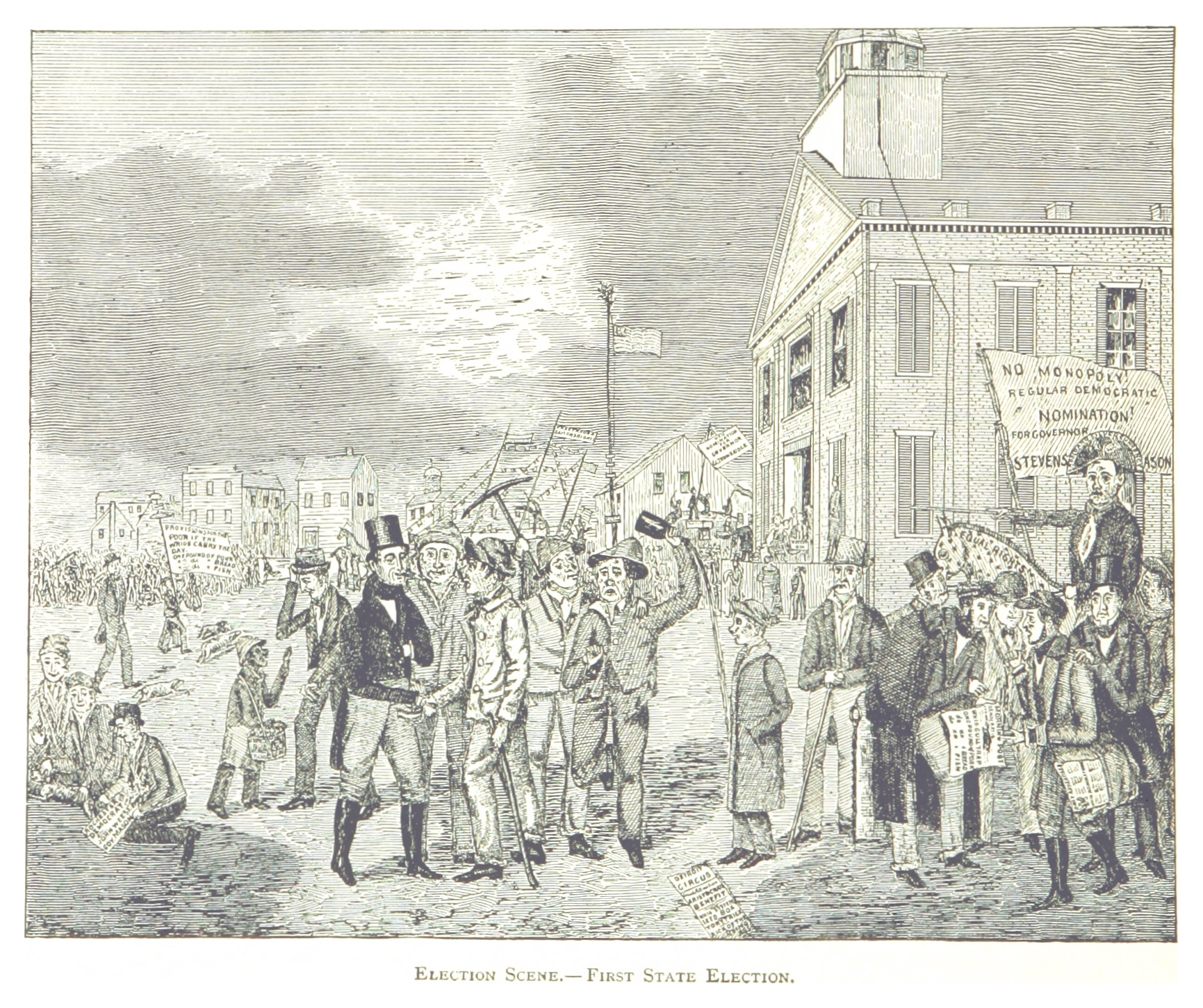
This 1837 Whig cartoon charges Mason with vote-buying, while promising a modest provision by the Whigs to the poor in the event of victory by Charles C. Trowbridge - mentioned in a sign near the middle of the page.

Although replaced by Horner, Mason was still popular in Michigan. Voters approved a constitution on October 5, 1835, and they elected Mason as governor. However, the U.S. Congress refused to recognize Michigan as a state until the dispute with Ohio was resolved.

In 1836, facing financial difficulties because Michigan was not recognized as a state, Mason agreed to a compromise reached by the U.S. Congress and agreed to cede the disputed land to Ohio in exchange for the western two-thirds of the Upper Peninsula; Michigan already included the eastern third. A convention in September 1836 refused to go along with Mason, but Mason finally prevailed in a second convention in December 1836. On January 26, 1837, Michigan was admitted to the Union.

In 1835, Mason had initiated an ambitious internal improvements program, which included development of three railroads and two canals (one of which was the Clinton-Kalamazoo Canal). Mason was re-elected in 1837, but the state's economy soon began to suffer from the effects of the Panic of 1837. Earlier in 1837, Mason had negotiated to fund the internal improvements program through the sale of $5,000,000 (equivalent to $144 million in 2024) in bonds. This arrangement fell apart in 1837 and following bankruptcies by both the company building the canal and the bank backing the loans, the state was left with over $2,000,000 (equivalent to $57.4 million in 2024) in bad debt. During his business trips to New York to finance his internal improvements program, Mason became acquainted with Julia Phelps and the two married on November 1, 1838.

In early 1838, Mason led the state militia in helping to thwart the Patriot War, an attempt by irregulars to invade and annex parts of Canada. The schooner Ann was seized by the Patriots on January 8 and sailed down to Gibraltar, Michigan. Mason, along with a detachment of 200 militiamen, pursued them in two steamships. A hundred Canadian militia also followed in the steamer Alliance. Mason met with the Patriot leaders at Gibraltar, but the captured steamship Ann continued on toward Fort Malden on the Canadian shore. On January 9, the Patriots began shelling Fort Malden and the town of Amherstburg from the Ann. The Canadian militia took up positions in the town while the Patriots moved 300 men onto the Canadian Bois Blanc Island opposite the town. The Canadian militia opened fire on the schooner when it tried to reach the island. The Canadians shot several of the ship's crew and damaged the sails and rigging. The ship drifted until it ran aground, at which point the Canadian militia boarded it, encountered no resistance, and captured the crew. The remaining Patriot forces quit Bois Blanc for the safety of the American side of the river. Several of the Patriots were wounded, a few killed, and the Canadians captured 300 muskets, 2 cannon, 10 kegs of gunpowder and various accoutrements. The actions of the so-called "Patriots" were charged in the U.S. as a violation of the Neutrality Act.

Rather than risking a contentious campaign and the possibility of an embarrassing defeat in the elections of 1839, Mason instead decided to give up politics and attempt a private law practice. His successor as governor, an old political rival, William Woodbridge, was determined to place the blame for Michigan's financial mess on Mason, and charged Mason with corruption related to the $5,000,000 loan. Mason attempted to defend himself, but his reputation was ruined.

== Retirement and death in New York ==
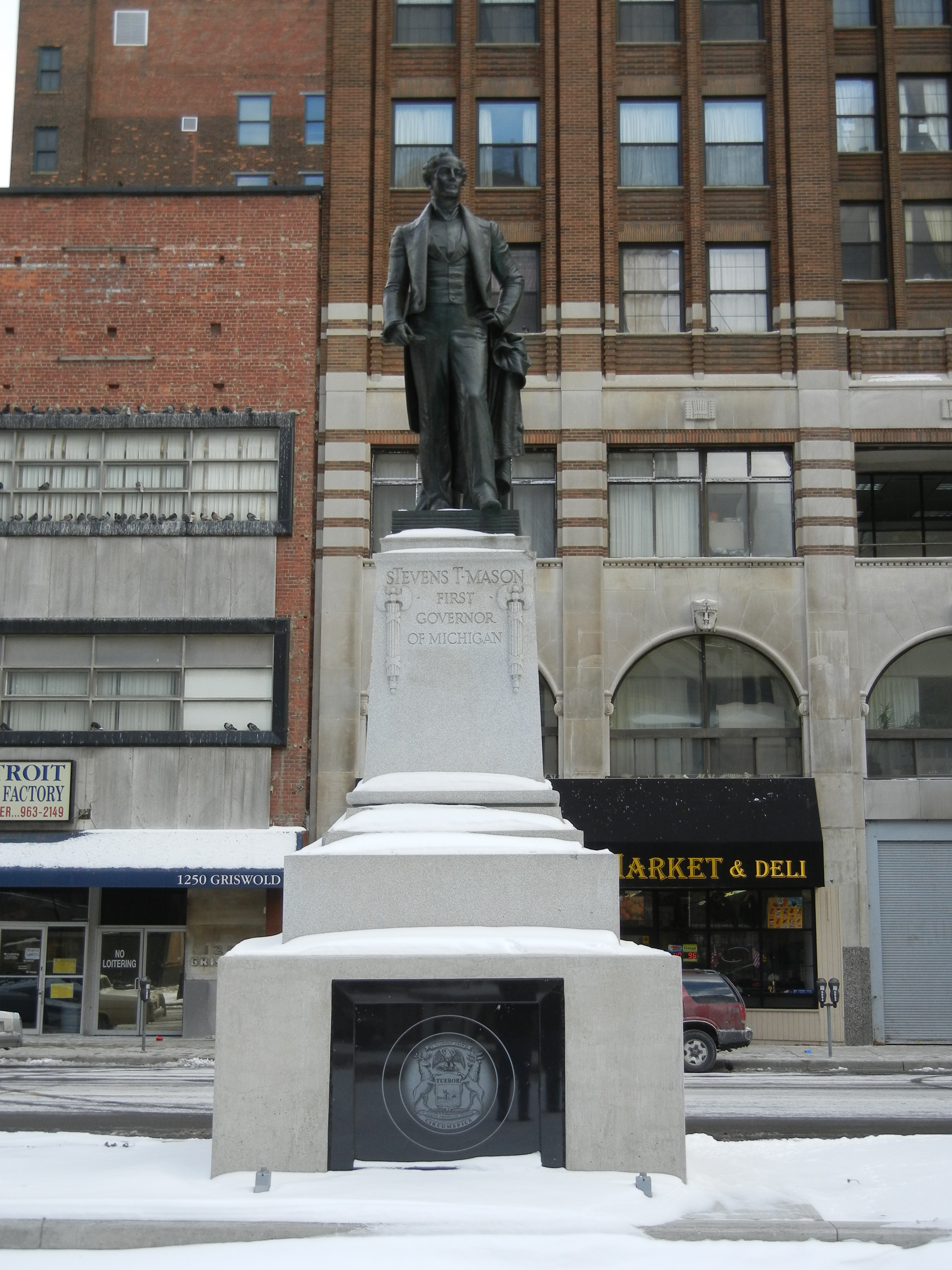
Renovated Stevens T. Mason Monument in 2011

In 1841, Mason left Michigan for New York City, where his wealthy father-in-law, Thaddeus Phelps, lived. Mason tried to establish a law practice there, but struggled to build a clientele. He caught pneumonia in the winter of 1842 and died at the age of 31 during the night of January 4, 1843, though his date of death is sometimes listed as January 5.

Mason was initially interred at New York Marble Cemetery, but on June 4, 1905, his remains were brought from New York to Detroit, accompanied by his sister Emily Mason, then age 92; his daughter, Dorothy Mason Wright; three grandsons; and several grand-nephews and great-grandchildren. Services were conducted by Rev. David M. Cooper, who had known Mason as governor, 70 years earlier. Other notable attendees included then-Governor Fred M. Warner, and the mayor of Detroit, George P. Codd. His remains were interred at Capitol Park, the site of the old Michigan Capitol. Later, a bronze statue of Mason on a granite pedestal was erected over the grave. The statue was created by sculptor Albert Weinert and depicted the young Mason in a confident pose.

On September 3, 2009, officials announced that the park would be reconfigured and the monument moved several yards. But when the crews began to excavate the site, they discovered no grave. After four days of searching, the vault containing the remains was located on June 29, 2010, a few yards south of its original site. It was believed the grave was moved from its 1905 location in 1955 to make room for a bus terminal.

On the 199th anniversary of his birth, October 27, 2010, Mason was reburied for the fourth time in a newly built vault in the pedestal beneath the bronze statue designed by Albert Weinert. Mason's great-great-great grandnephew, who resides in Grosse Ile, Michigan, witnessed the reinterment. The current dean of the Cathedral Church of St. Paul, where funeral services were held for Mason in 1843, officiated at the ceremony. Prior to the reinterment, Mason's remains were transported to Lansing where they lay in state in the Capitol Building. Mason was only the fourth Michigan governor to lie in state in the Capitol.

Among his other accomplishments, Mason created an educational system and relocated the University of Michigan to Ann Arbor.

== Marriage and children ==
Mason married Julia Elizabeth Phelps in New York City on November 1, 1838. The couple had three children:

- Stevens Thomson Mason Jr. (August 1, 1839 – January 27, 1843)
- Dorothea Eliza Mason Wright (October 29, 1840 – October 4, 1916) Known as Dora, she was the daughter-in-law of Senator William Wright and wife of Colonel Edward H. Wright (1824–1913), a career officer in the United States Army. Dora and Edward Wright were the parents of William M. Wright, a U.S. Army officer who attained the rank of lieutenant general.
- Thaddeus Phelps Mason (March 11, 1842–April 1847)

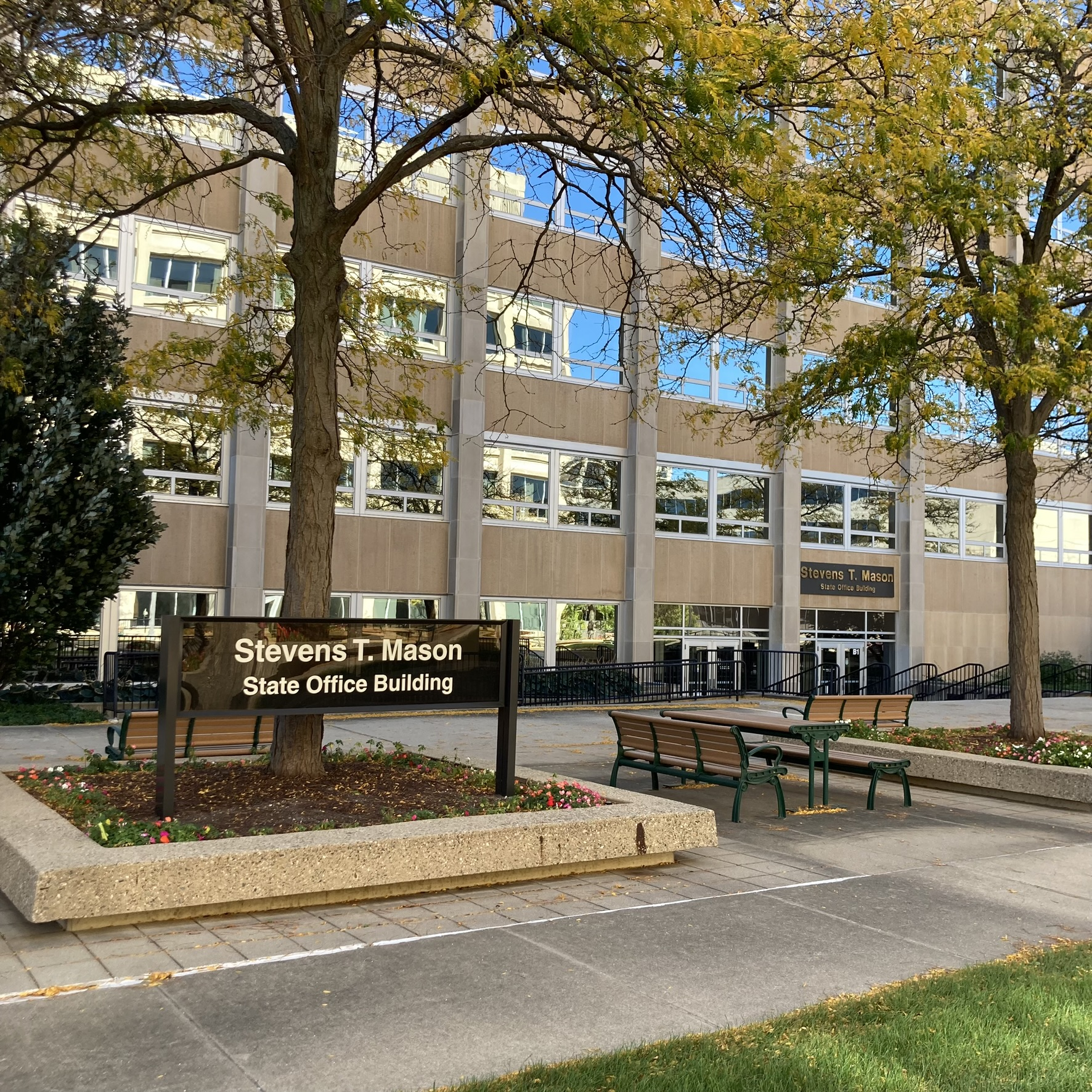
Stevens T. Mason State Office Building in Lansing, Michigan

== Places named in Mason's honor ==
- The city of Mason, Michigan, the county seat of Ingham County, where the state capital, Lansing, is located.
- Mason County, Michigan
- Lawrence, Michigan was originally named Mason from 1835 to 1843 Lawrence, Michigan
- Mason Hall at Michigan State University
- Mason Hall at the University of Michigan
- Stevens T. Mason State Office Building in Lansing, Michigan
- Mason Senior High School in Erie Township, Michigan
- Stevens T. Mason Elementary School in Grosse Pointe Woods, Michigan
- Stevens T. Mason Middle School in Waterford Township, Michigan
- Mason Elementary School in Detroit, Michigan
- Mason Street in Green Bay, Wisconsin
- Mason Street in Milwaukee, Wisconsin
- Mason Street in Saginaw, Michigan

== See also ==
- List of governors of Michigan

== Bibliography ==
- Catlin, George Byron (2005) [1923]. The story of Detroit. Ann Arbor: University of Michigan Library.
- Downes, C. (1972). "The Rise and Fall of Toledo, Michigan ... the Toledo War, (reviewed)". Michigan History. Vol. 56. pp. 82–83.
- Elliott, Frank N. "When the Railroad Was King". Michigan History. Vol. 49. p. 295.
- George, Mary Karl (1971). The Rise and Fall of Toledo, Michigan . . . the Toledo War. Lansing: Michigan Historical Commission.
- Hagman, Harlan L. (1981). Bright Michigan Morning: The Years of Governor Tom Mason. Green Oak Press. ISBN 978-0-9316-0002-9.
- Hemans, Lawton T. (1920). Life and Times of Stevens Thomson Mason the Boy Governor of Michigan (2nd ed.). Michigan Historical Commission.
- Jenks, William L. (1931). "Michigan's Five Million Dollar Loan". Michigan History. Vol. 15. pp. 575–633.
- Lansing: Franklin DeKleine Company and the Michigan Historical Commission, 1930.
- Lansing, Michigan: Michigan Historical Commission, 1971.
- Norton, Clark F. "Michigan Statehood: 1835, 1836, or 1837". Michigan History. Vol. 36. pp. 323, 327, 333.
- Malone, Dumas, ed. (1933). Dictionary of American Biography. Vol. 12. New York: Charles Scribner's Sons.
- Shade, William G. "Banks and Politics in Michigan, 1835–1845: A Reconsideration". Michigan History. Vol. 57. pp. 32, 38–9, 42.
- Spill, William A. "University of Michigan: Beginnings-III". Michigan History. Vol. 13. p. 233.

Party political offices
First	Democratic nominee for Governor of Michigan; 1835, 1837	Succeeded by Elon Farnsworth
Political offices
Preceded by George Bryan Porter	Territorial Governor of Michigan; 1834–1835	Succeeded by John S. Horner
Preceded by John S. Horner; Territorial Governor	Governor of Michigan; 1835–1840	Succeeded by William Woodbridge
