= Thomson Mason =

American judge (1733–1785)

Member of the Virginia House of Burgesses from Stafford County
- In office 1758–1761 Serving with Thomas Ludwell Lee
- Preceded by: William Fitzhugh
- Succeeded by: William Fitzhugh
- In office 1766–1772 Serving with John Alexander
- Preceded by: William Fitzhugh
- Succeeded by: Yelverton Peyton

Member of the Virginia House of Delegates from Loudoun County
- In office May 5, 1777 – December 19, 1778 Serving with Josiah Clapham
- Preceded by: Francis Peyton
- Succeeded by: Francis Peyton; Levin Powell

Member of the Virginia House of Delegates from Elizabeth City County
- In office May 3, 1779 – June 9, 1780 Serving with John Tabb
- Preceded by: Miles King; Worlich Westwood
- Succeeded by: William Henry

Member of the Virginia House of Delegates from Stafford County
- In office May 5, 1783 – May 2, 1784 Serving with Charles Carter
- Preceded by: John Francis Mercer
- Succeeded by: Bailey Washington Jr.

Personal details
- Born: August 14, 1733 Doeg's Neck, Colony of Virginia
- Died: February 26, 1785 (aged 51) Chopawamsic, Stafford County, Virginia, U.S.
- Resting place: Mason family burial ground at Raspberry Plain Plantation, near Leesburg, Virginia, U.S.
- Spouse: Mary King Barnes (m. 1758; died 1771) Elizabeth (née Westwood) Wallace (m. 1777)
- Children: Stevens Thomson Mason; Abram Barnes Thomson Mason; John Thomson Mason; Ann Thomson Mason Chichester; Dorothea Anna Thomson Mason Hirst; Westwood Thomson Mason; William Temple Thomson Mason; George Thomson Mason
- Parent(s): George Mason III; Ann Stevens Thomson
- Relatives: George Mason IV (brother)
- Education: College of William and Mary
- Occupation: Planter, lawyer, jurist

Thomson Mason (14 August 1733 – 26 February 1785) was an American barrister, planter and politician. A younger brother of George Mason IV and delegate from Virginia to the Constitutional Convention, Thomson Mason was the father of Stevens Thomson Mason (who after service in the American Revolutionary War followed his father's career into law and politics and eventually become a U.S. Senator from Virginia), and was the great-grandfather of Stevens T. Mason, first Governor of Michigan.

== Early life ==
Mason was born at Doeg's Neck on 14 August 1733. Born into one of the First Families of Virginia, he was the third and youngest child of George Mason III and his wife Ann Stevens Thomson. Their father died in a ferry accident when his sons were boys, but their mother supervised operations of the family's plantations (farmed using enslaved labor) as well as acquired land in what became Prince William, Fairfax and Loudoun Counties for her younger sons (since primogeniture meant their eldest brother George would receive the lands his father inherited). Thomson Mason like his brothers received a private education suitable to his class, then traveled to Williamsburg, for studies at the College of William & Mary. He was admitted to the Middle Temple in 1751.

== Career ==
Upon returning to Virginia, Mason was admitted to the Virginia bar and developed a private legal practice. After marrying Mary King Barnes, the daughter of Col. Barnes of Leonardtown, Maryland, across the Potomac River and a major local slave trader, Thomson Mason represented his father-in-law's interests in America during his frequent trips to England. In 1758 he also became Barnes' partner in some of the voyages in which Virginia or Maryland tobacco was shipped to Europe and slaves imported from Africa on the return journey.

Voters in Stafford County elected Mason several times as a burgess in the House of Burgesses. He served alongside Thomas Ludwell Lee in the 1756-1761 session, but neither man won re-election. Stafford County voters then elected (and re-elected) Mason to represent them along with John Alexander from 1766 until 1772, when he was replaced by Yelverton Peyton.

In 1760, Mason had purchased a plantation he would call Raspberry Plain in Loudoun County, Virginia, which he operated (like Chopowamsic) using enslaved labor. Thomson built the mansion at Raspberry Plain in 1771, moved there after his first wife's death, and gained a reputation as a good host. Shortly before his death, Thomson Mason owned 47 slaves in Loudoun County. Upon Thomson's death, his eldest son Stevens Thomson Mason inherited Raspberry Plain.

Thus, during the First Virginia Revolutionary Convention in 1774, Mason represented Loudoun County, together with Francis Peyton and Josias Clapham. However, Thomson Mason became the only delegate to oppose a nonimportation resolution, and decided to retire from public life, citing ill health. Nonetheless, his firstborn son and heir, Stevens Thomson Mason, served with distinction in the Continental Army.

Three years later, Loudoun County voters elected (and re-elected) Mason and Clapham as their (part-time) representatives in the Virginia House of Delegates during the 1777 and 1778 sessions. Then, the widower Mason rekindled a romance with Elizabeth Westwood, whose husband, James Wallace of Elizabeth City County had died. They married in November 1777, but the new bride came to consider Loudoun County nearly backcountry. Perhaps as a result of her influence, Elizabeth City County voters elected Mason as one of their representatives in the Virginia House of Delegates in early 1779. Mason's resignation on June 9 was refused, until the House found him ineligible and forced a new election, in which William Henry was elected to serve alongside John Tabb.

In 1778, fellow legislators elected Mason one of five judges in the General Court (now the Supreme Court of Virginia, alongside Joseph Jones, John Blair, Thomas Ludwell Lee and Paul Carrington. This would have made him ineligible for further legislative service.

Following the American Revolutionary War, and another legislative reorganization of the state judiciary, Stafford County voters again elected the ailing Mason as one of their representatives in the House of Delegates in 1783, and he served a final term alongside veteran legislator Charles Carter. There Mason became chairman of the Committee on Courts of Justice, but did not attempt re-election. He died at Chopawamsic in 1785.

== Personal life ==
Mason married Mary King Barnes, the only daughter of Colonel Abraham Barnes and Mary King, in 1758. He and Mary had four children:

- Stevens Thomson Mason (29 December 1760–9 May 1803)
- Abram Barnes Thomson Mason (24 August 1763–12 January 1813)
- John Thomson Mason (15 March 1765–10 December 1824)
- Ann Thomson Mason Chichester (26 February 1769–29 August 1817)

Mary died on 21 October 1771 in Prince William County, Virginia, and was interred in the Mason family graveyard at Gunston Hall, but after Thomson Mason's death she was reinterred at Raspberry Plain per his instructions to their son Stevens Thomson Mason. Six years later on 23 November 1777, Mason married Elizabeth (née Westwood) Wallace, a sister of Worlich Westwood. Mason had four children with Elizabeth:

- Dorothea "Anne" Anna Thomson Mason Hirst (10 April 1778–5 May 1822)
- Westwood Thomson Mason (20 December 1780–1826)
- William Temple Thomson Mason (24 July 1782–1862)
- George Thomson Mason (died 1878)

== Death and legacy ==
Mason died on 26 February 1785 at Chopawamsic at the age of 51. His will directed that neither Westwood Thomson Mason nor William Temple Thomson Mason should reside "on the south side of the James River or below Williamsburg before they respectively attain the age of twenty-one years, lest they should imbibe more exalted notions of their own importance than I could wish any child of mine to possess." Furthermore, he wanted his first wife to be reinterred and buried beside him, and his late infant son George buried at his head. Part of Raspberry Plain Plantation survives today as part of the Catoctin Rural Historic District, although the house that Thomson Mason built and that his descendants altered, burned and was torn down in the early 20th century and replaced in 1910 by the current edifice in the Colonial Revival style.

== Bibliography ==
- Grigsby, Hugh Blair (1891). Brock, Robert Alonzo (ed.). The History of the Virginia Federal Convention of 1788, With Some Account of the Eminent Virginians of that Era Who Were Members of the Body. Richmond, Virginia: Virginia Historical Society – via Google Books.
- The Colonial Dames of America (1910). Ancestral Records and Portraits: A Compilation from the Archives of Chapter I, the Colonial Dames of America. Vol. II. New York: The Grafton Press. p. 808 – via the Internet Archive.
- Fothergill, Augusta Bridgland; Naugle, John Mark (1940). Virginia Tax Payers 1782-1787; Other Than Those Published by the United States Census Bureau.
- Copeland, Pamela C.; MacMaster, Richard K. (1975). The Five George Masons: Patriots and Planters of Virginia and Maryland. University Press of Virginia. ISBN 0-8139-0550-8.
- Leonard, Cynthia Miller, ed. (1978). The General Assembly of Virginia, July 30, 1619–January 11, 1978. Richmond: Virginia State Library. ISBN 9780884900085.
