= Richard Mason =

Richard Mason may refer to:

== Writers ==
- Richard Mason (novelist, 1919–1997), English author of The World of Suzie Wong
- Richard Mason (novelist, born 1977), South African-English author of The Drowning People
- Richard Mason (Welsh author) (1816–1881), printer and author

== Others ==
- Richard Mason (historian) (1934–2009), also known as R.H.P. Mason
- Richard Mason (politician) (c. 1633–1685), British Member of Parliament
- Richard Mason (explorer) (1935–1961), British explorer
- Richard Mason (film producer) (1926–2002), Australian
- Angelus of St. Francis Mason (1599–1678), English Franciscan friar, born Richard Mason
- Richard Barnes Mason (1797–1850), military governor of California
- Richard Chichester Mason (1793–1869), American physician and Confederate States Army serviceman
- Richard Nelson Mason (1876–1940), American educator and businessperson
- Richard Mason Rocca (born 1977), Italian-American basketball player
- Richard Mason (RAF officer) (born 1966), British air commodore
- Richard Mason (priest) (1929–1997), Anglican clergyman
