= John Ariss =

American architect

- Born: 1725; Westmoreland County, Colony of Virginia
- Died: 1799 (aged 73–74); Jefferson County, Virginia
- Occupation: Architect
- Buildings: Traveller's Rest (West Virginia), Mount Airy, Richmond County, Virginia

Architect John Ariss (sometimes spelled Ayres) (1725–1799) was born in Westmoreland County, Virginia to a family long settled in the Old Dominion. Several houses now considered National Historic Landmarks have been attributed to him. One of the best documented surviving examples of his work is Traveller's Rest in Kearneysville, West Virginia, which he designed as a farmstead home for American Revolutionary War General Horatio Gates. Ariss is also believed to have designed the Neo-Palladian estate Mount Airy, located in Richmond County, Virginia on Virginia's Northern Neck. In the 1930s, Harewood, a home constructed for Samuel Washington (George Washington's brother, who died in 1781) and also now a National Historic Landmark, was also attributed to Ariss, who lived nearby.

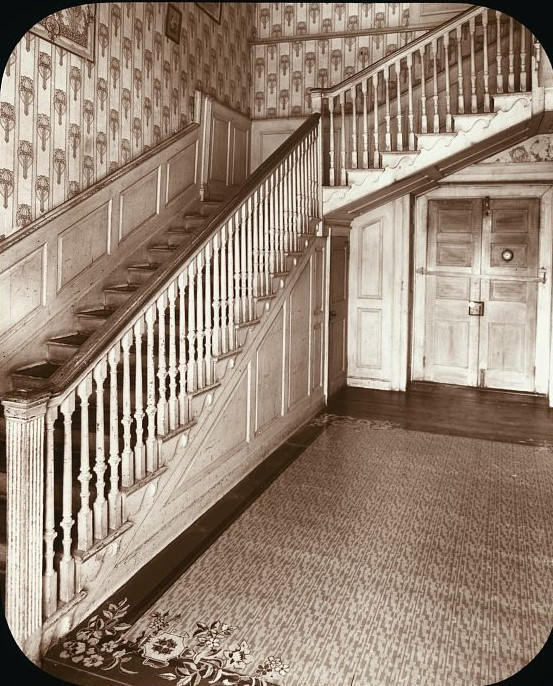
"Harewood," Samuel Washington house, designed by John Ariss in 1770, photographed by Frances Benjamin Johnston, ca. 1930s

Ariss was born in Westmoreland County in 1725, but by 1743 his father was dead and Ariss apparently chose his brother Spencer Ariss as his guardian. Subsequently, Ariss may have been sent to England for schooling because his return from England is noted in 1751. In 1755, Ariss moved to nearby Richmond County, and in 1767 he moved further westward, this time to Fauquier County. By 1770, Ariss had moved even further westward to what late became Berkeley County and part of which in 1801 would become Jefferson County, where he sat on the vestry of Norborne Parish. Ariss was a longtime friend of General George Washington, to whom he rented his home. Some also believe that Ariss had a role in designing the Washington home at Mount Vernon.

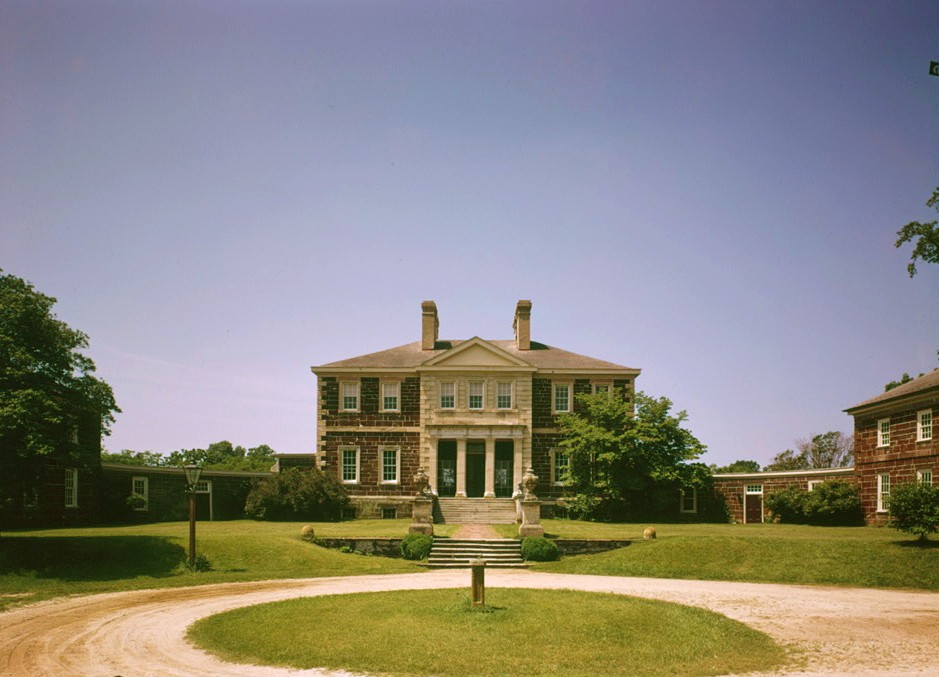
Mount Airy

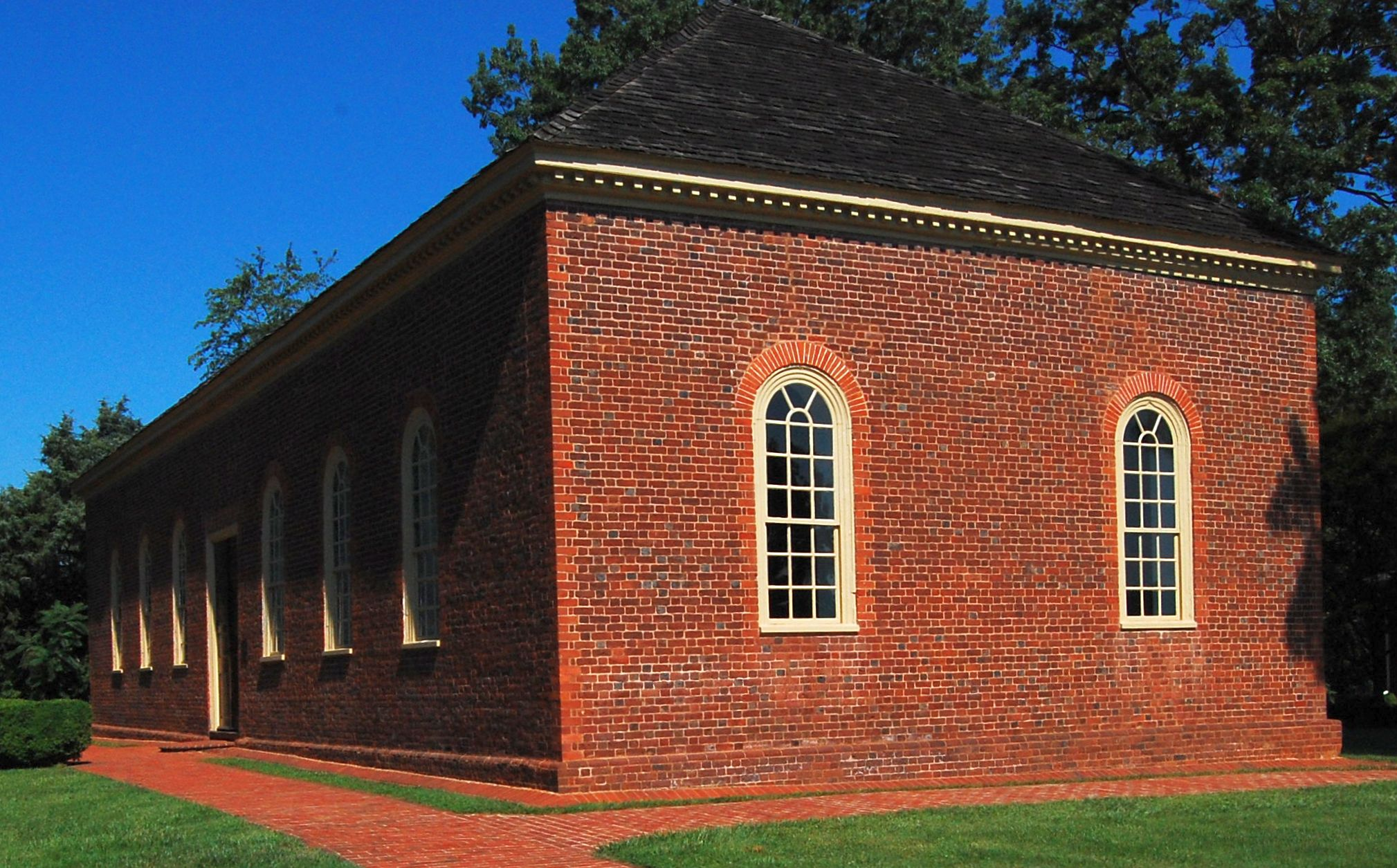
Little Fork Church

The relationship between the two families was of long standing: Ariss was the great-grandson of Col. Nicholas Spencer of Cople Parish, Westmoreland, who had patented the Mount Vernon estate with his friend Lt. Col. John Washington.

A number of Ariss's works are listed on the U.S. National Register of Historic Places (NRHP).

== Works ==
- Elmwood (built 1774), SW of jct. of Rtes. 640 and U.S. 17 Loretto, VA, NRHP-listed
- Fairfield, E of jct. of Rtes. 340 and 610 Berryville, VA, NRHP-listed
- Lamb's Creek Church, VA 607 Sealston, VA, NRHP-listed
- Little England, E of Gloucester on VA 672 Gloucester, VA, NRHP-listed
- Little Fork Church, jct. of Rtes. 624 and 726 Rixeyville, VA, NRHP-listed
- Menokin, NW of jct. of Rtes. 690 and 621 Warsaw, VA, NRHP-listed
- Mount Airy, W of Warsaw on U.S. 360 Warsaw, VA, NRHP-listed
- Harewood (West Virginia), designed in 1770 for Samuel Washington, NRHP-listed
