= Rellim Farm =

Historic house in West Virginia, United States

- U.S. National Register of Historic Places
- U.S. Historic district
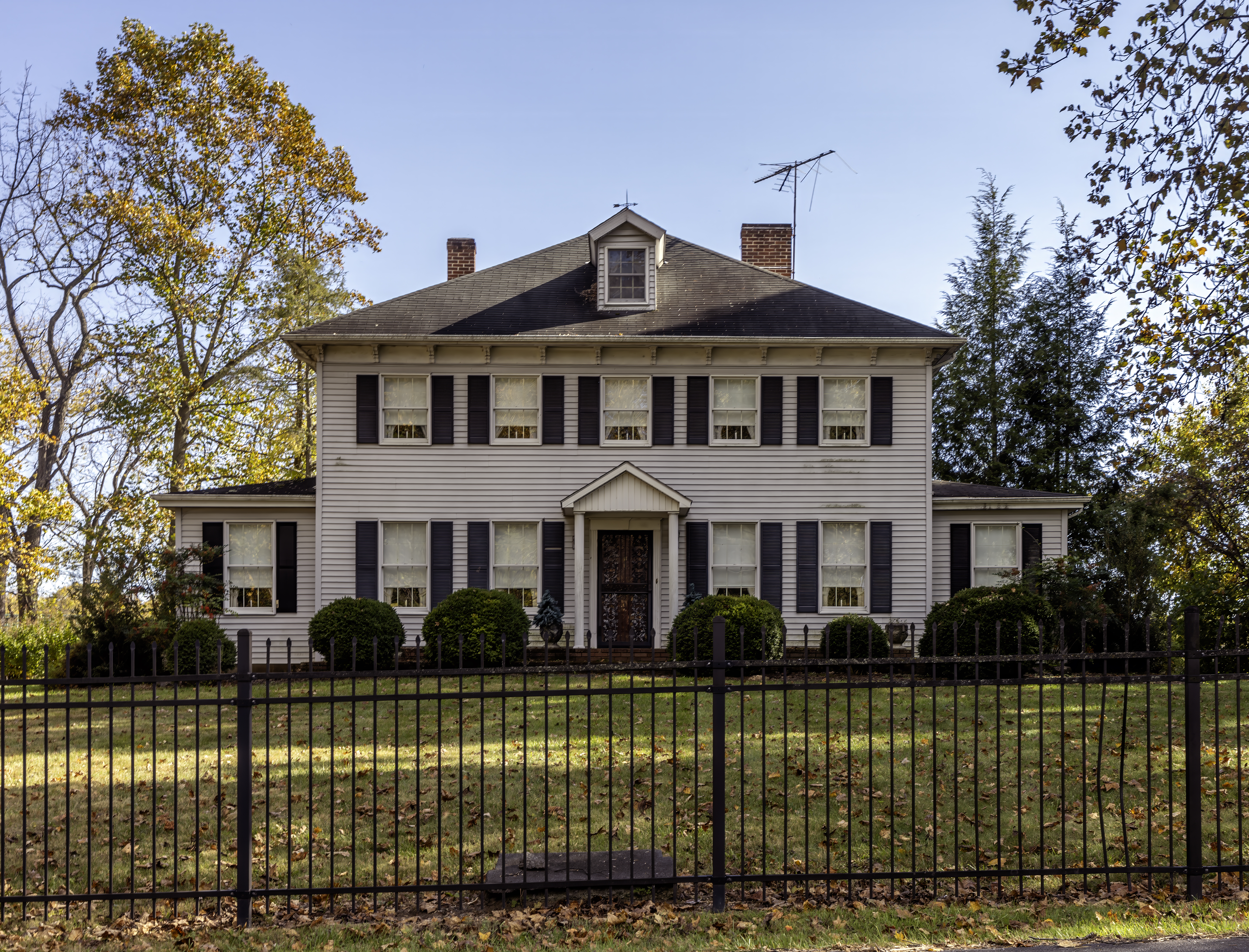
- Rellim Farm in 2024

- Location within West Virginia Location within the United States
- Location: Kearneysville, West Virginia
- Coordinates: 39°22′51″N 77°53′15″W
- Built: 1905
- Architect: Abraham Miller, Paul Miller Sr.
- NRHP reference No.: 98001467
- Added to NRHP: December 4, 1998

The Rellim Farm near Kearneysville, West Virginia is a 50-acre (20 ha) farm and orchard complex which was once part of the nearby Traveller's Rest property. The upper Shenandoah Valley region supports a significant fruit industry, and Rellim Farm is a representative example of this form of agriculture, the oldest family-owned operation in Jefferson County. Beginning in the 1930s, Paul Miller Sr. began to work with the nearby West Virginia University Experimental Farm in the development of spray technology, which was applied throughout the industry.

"Rellim" is derived from "Miller" spelled backwards.
