= Richard Nelson Mason =

American educator (1876–1940)

- Born: Richard Nelson Mason; June 26, 1876; Culpeper, Virginia, US
- Died: November 22, 1940 (aged 64); Garfield Hospital, Washington, D.C., US
- Resting place: Ivy Hill Cemetery (Alexandria, Virginia)
- Occupations: Educator and principal
- Employer: Gunston Hall School
- Parent: Beverley Randolph Mason (father)
- Relatives: George Mason IV (great-great grandfather); Richard Chichester Mason (grandfather)

Richard Nelson Mason (June 26, 1876 – November 22, 1940) was an American educator and school principal in Washington, D.C. He was the principal of Gunston Hall School, which was founded by his parents. Mason was a great-great-grandson George Mason.

== Early life ==
Mason was born in Culpeper, Virginia on June 26, 1876. He was the only son of Beverley Randolph Mason and his wife Elizabeth Harrison Nelson. Mason was named after his grandfather, Dr. Richard Chichester Mason.

Mason and his siblings were first raised and educated at the family residence at 3017 O Street, N.W. in Georgetown. Mason's parents started a school to educate their children and friends' children. The school was named Gunston Hall School for Mason's great-great-grandfather George Mason. As Gunston Hall School grew, it became an institution of higher learning for girls and young ladies.

== Career ==
Mason was an educator at and later become the business manager of the Gunston Hall School after it moved to its final location at 1906 Florida Avenue, N.W. Mason's management maintained the school's tradition and continued its high ranking among private schools for young ladies in the United States. He continued his role as business manager of the Gunston Hall School until his death.

== Personal life ==
Mason married Blanche Andrews on October 31, 1925. They had one daughter, Elizabeth Nelson Mason (born 27 November 1935.

Mason was elected into the Sons of the American Revolution on 27 May 1915, due to his descent from his great-grandfather, Robert Randolph (1759–1825).

Mason died on November 22, 1940, at Garfield Hospital in Washington, D.C. He was interred on November 25, 1940, at Ivy Hill Cemetery in Alexandria, Virginia.

== Ancestry ==
Ancestors of Richard Nelson Mason

16. George Mason IV
8. Thomson Mason
17. Ann Eilbeck
4. Richard Chichester Mason
18. Stevens Thomson
9. Sarah McCarty Chichester
19. Dorothea Taunton
2. Beverley Randolph Mason
20. Peter Randolph
10. Robert Randolph
21. Lucy Cocke Bolling
5. Lucy Bolling Randolph
22. Charles Carter
11. Elizabeth Hill Carter
23. Mary Walker Carter
1. Richard Nelson Mason
24. Thomas Nelson
12. Hugh Nelson
25. Lucy Grymes
6. Keating Lewis Simmons Nelson
26. Francis Kinloch
13. Elizabeth Kinloch
27. Mildred Walker
3. Elizabeth Harrison Nelson
14. Thornton Rogers
7. Julia Ann Rogers
15. Margaret Hart
