= Beverley Randolph Mason =

Confederate Army officer and educator

- Born: September 1, 1834; Okeley Manor, Fairfax County, Virginia, US
- Died: April 22, 1910 (aged 75); Washington, D.C., US
- Burial place: Ivy Hill Cemetery, Alexandria, Virginia
- Military career
- Allegiance: Confederate States of America
- Branch: Confederate States Army
- Service years: 1861–1865
- Rank: major (CSA)
- Commands: Black Horse Cavalry; 4th Virginia Regiment
- Conflicts: American Civil War
- Other work: Educator, founder and principal of Gunston Hall School

Beverley Randolph Mason (September 1, 1834 – April 22, 1910) was an American military officer and educator who was the founder and principal of the Gunston Hall School for young women in Washington, D.C. Mason was a great-grandson of George Mason, author of the Virginia Bill of Rights.

== Early life ==
Mason was born at Okeley Manor in Fairfax County, Virginia on September 1, 1834. His parents were Dr. Richard Chichester Mason and Lucy Bolling Randolph. He was a great-grandson of George Mason, author of the Virginia Bill of Rights.

After graduating from school, Mason went to Philadelphia, Pennsylvania where he pursued business.

== Civil War ==
At the onset of the American Civil War, Mason volunteered as a private in the Black Horse Cavalry of Fauquier County, Virginia. Soon afterward, Mason was detailed to act as commissary sergeant and supplied food to his command. He gained a captain's commission in the 4th Virginia Cavalry, and later a major's rank as assistant commissary in Fitzhugh Lee's division. Mason became quartermaster in 1864.

== Career ==
After the war, Mason engaged in business and, then, took up the profession of teaching. He taught at the United States Military Academy in West Point, New York. He returned Virginia and taught mathematics and Latin at the Norwood Institute. In 1892, he founded Gunston Hall School for Young Ladies at his home in Washington, D.C.; the school was named for the homestead of his great-grandfather George Mason. Mason and his wife opened their school ifor their children and the children of their intimate friends.

Gunston Hall School moved to a larger campus and operated as a boarding school for young women for fifty years. After its closure, the building housed Epiphany School, an Episcopal institution. The building is currently the home of the National Museum of American Jewish Military History. Mason's character impressed itself upon his students and his influence among them was widely felt and acknowledged by the students of successive years.

== Personal life ==
Mason married Elizabeth "Bettie" Harrison Nelson at St. Stephen's Church on August 18, 1875. She was the daughter of Keating Lewis Simmons Nelson and his wife Julia Ann Rogers of Albemarle County, Virginia. The couple had six children:

- Richard Nelson Mason (26 June 1876–22 November 1940)
- Julia Nelson Mason Matthews (23 January 1878–27 December 1964)
- Lucy Randolph Mason Moffett (31 January 1880–1 April 1965)
- Margaret Thornton Mason (7 February 1882–February 1884)
- Mary Wallace Mason Patchin (26 April 1884–28 August 1963)
- Susan Josephine Beverley Mason Easley (17 January 1888–31 July 1962)

In 1879, the family moved to Washington, D.C. to a large mansion at 3017 O Street, N.W., previously the home Commodore Stephen Cassin.

Mason died on April 22, 1910 in Washington, D.C. at age 75. His funeral, which took place on April 24, at St. Margaret's Episcopal Church in Washington, D.C. The Reverend Herbert Scott Smith and the Reverend Samuel A. Wallis conducted the services. Mason was buried at Ivy Hill Cemetery in Alexandria, Virginia. The Robert E. Lee Camp of Confederate Veterans of Alexandria attended his burial in uniform.

== Ancestry ==
Ancestors of Beverley Randolph Mason

16. George Mason III
8. George Mason IV
17. Ann Stevens Thomson
4. Thomson Mason
18. William Eilbeck
9. Ann Eilbeck
19. Sarah Edgar
2. Richard Chichester Mason
20. Richard Chichester
10. Richard Chichester
21. Ellen Ball
5. Sarah McCarty Chichester
22. Daniel McCarty
11. Sarah McCarty
23. Sinah Ball
1. Beverley Randolph Mason
24. William Randolph, Jr.
12. Peter Randolph
25. Elizabeth Peyton Beverley
6. Robert Randolph
26. Robert Bolling
13. Lucy Cocke Bolling
27. Anne Cocke
3. Lucy Bolling Randolph
28. John Carter
14. Charles Carter
29. Elizabeth Hill
7. Elizabeth Hill Carter
30. Charles Carter
15. Mary Walker Carter
31. Mary Walker
