= 4th Virginia Cavalry Regiment =

Confederate States Army unit

- Flag of Virginia, 1861
- Active: September 1861 – April 1865
- Disbanded: April 1865
- Country: Confederacy
- Allegiance: Confederate States of America
- Branch: Confederate States Army
- Role: Cavalry
- Nickname: Black Horse Cavalry
- Engagements: Peninsula Campaign; Seven Days' Battles; Second Battle of Bull Run; Battle of Antietam; Battle of Fredericksburg; Battle of Chancellorsville; Battle of Brandy Station; Battle of Gettysburg; Bristoe Campaign; Overland Campaign; Siege of Petersburg; Valley Campaigns of 1864; Appomattox Campaign; Battle of Five Forks

Commanders
- Notable commanders: Colonel Beverly Robertson; Lt. Colonel Stephen D. Lee; Colonel William H. F. Payne

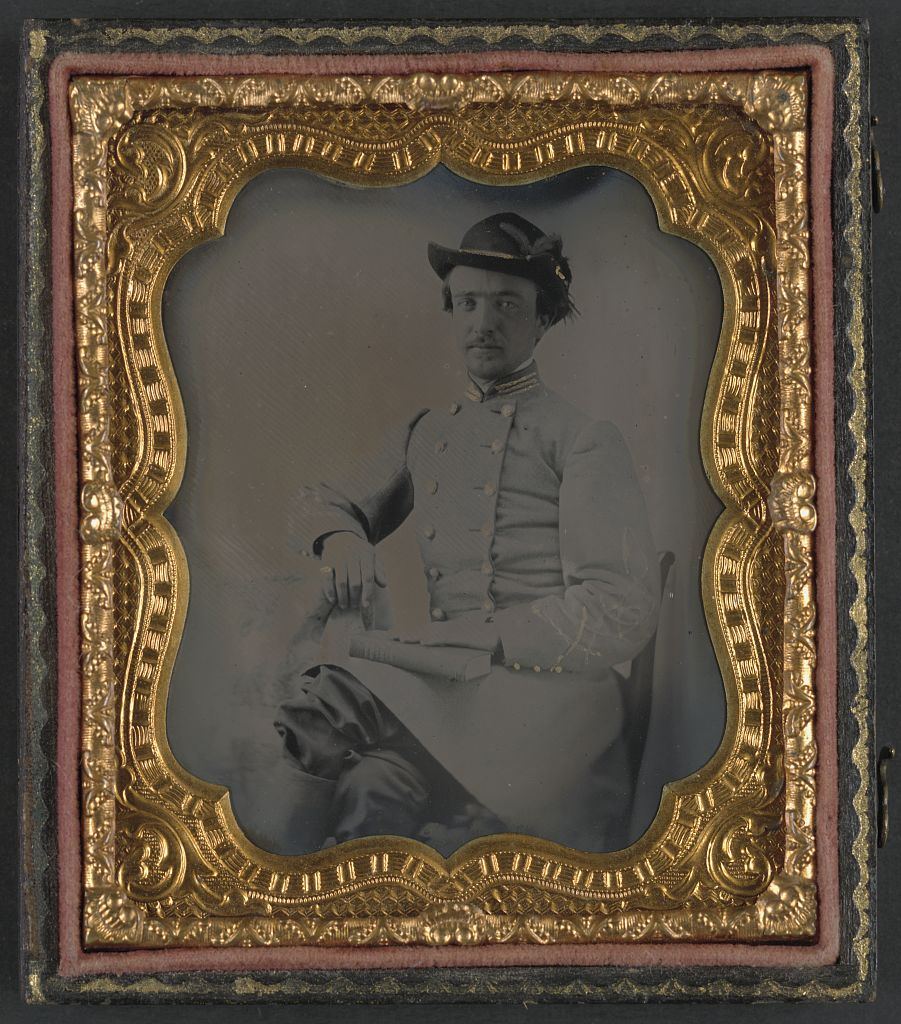
Captain William A. Hill of Company D, 4th Virginia Cavalry Regiment

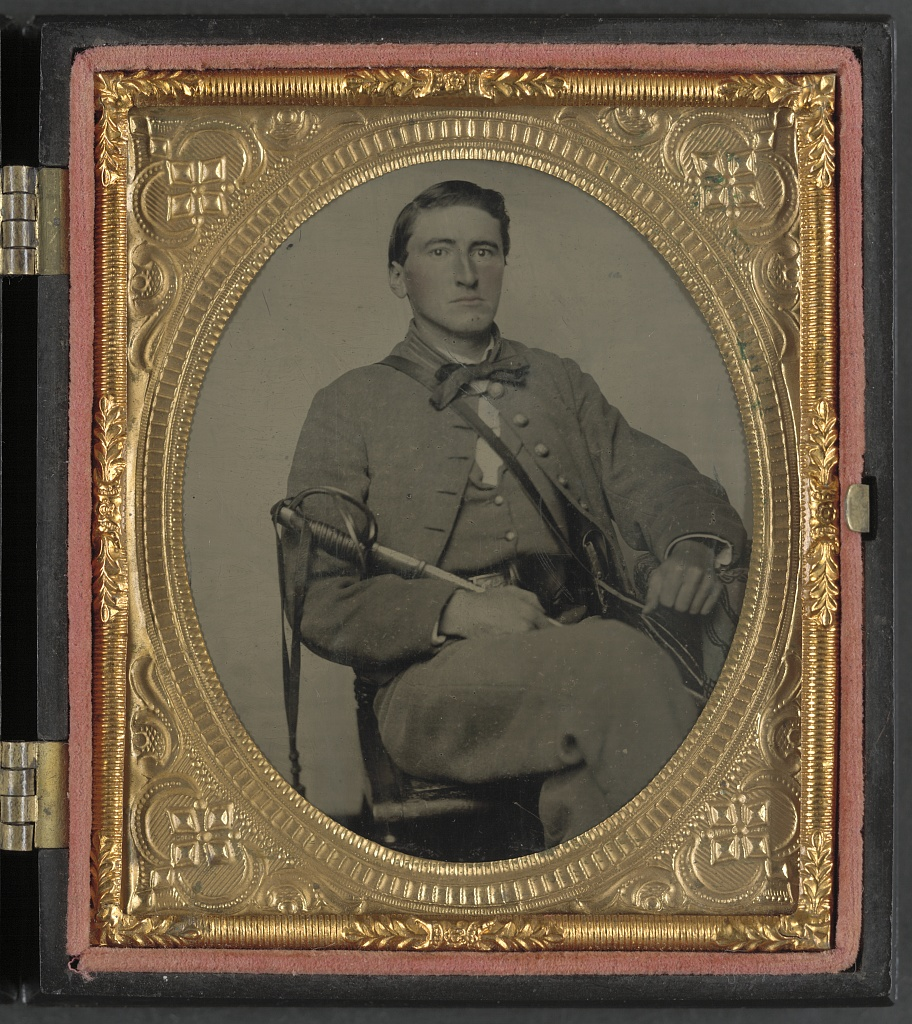
Captain Alexander Dixon Payne of Co. H, 4th Virginia Cavalry Regiment

The 4th Virginia Cavalry Regiment was a cavalry regiment raised in Virginia for service in the Confederate States Army during the American Civil War. It fought mostly with the Army of Northern Virginia.

== History ==
The Virginia 4th Cavalry completed its organization at Sangster's Cross Roads, Prince William County, Virginia, in September, 1861. The 4th Virginia Cavalry Regiment included the following companies (all previously independent militia companies):

- Co. A - The Prince William Cavalry (Prince William County);
- Co. B - The Chesterfield Light Dragoons (Chesterfield County);
- Co. C - The Madison Invincibles (Madison County);
- Co. D - The Little Fork Rangers (named for the Little Fork Church in Culpeper County);
- Co. E - The Powhatan Troop (Powhatan County);
- Co. F - The Goochland Light Dragoons (Goochland County);
- Co. G - The Hanover Light Dragoons (Hanover County);
- Co. H - The Black Horse Troop (Warrenton, Fauquier County);
- Co. I - The Governor's Mounted Guard (Richmond);
- Co. J - Philip McKinney's Company (Buckingham County).

The unit was assigned to General J.E.B. Stuart's, F. Lee's, Wickham's, and Munford's Brigade, Army of Northern Virginia. It participated in the Battle of Williamsburg, the Seven Days' Battles, and the Second Bull Run and Maryland campaigns. Later the unit was involved in the conflicts at Fredericksburg, Kelly's Ford, Chancellorsville, Brandy Station, Upperville, Gettysburg, Bristoe, Mine Run, The Wilderness, Todd's Tavern, Spotsylvania, Wilson's Wharf, Haw's Shop, and Bethesda Church. The 4th went on to fight in the Shenandoah Valley with Early and around Appomattox.

It totaled 450 effectives in April, 1862, and lost about three percent of the 544 engaged at Gettysburg. After cutting through the Federal lines at Appomattox, it was broken up. Only 2 members were present at the surrender. The field officers were Colonels Stephen D. Lee, William H. F. Payne, Beverly Robertson, Williams Carter Wickham, and W.B. Wooldridge; Lieutenant Colonels Charles Old and Robert Randolph; and Majors Alexander M. Hobson and Robert E. Utterback.

Future Virginia governor Philip W. McKinney was an officer in Company K of the 4th Virginia.

VMI Superintendent Scott Shipp is said to have served as a private in the 4th Virginia, though no official record exists.

Beverley Randolph Mason, the future founder of Gunston Hall School in Washington, D.C., became a captain in command of a company of the 4th Virginia.

== See also ==
- List of Virginia Civil War units
