= Opequon =

Opequon refers to several placenames in the Shenandoah Valley of Virginia and West Virginia, United States.

- Opequon, Virginia is an unincorporated community in Frederick County, Virginia
- Opequon Creek is a tributary stream of the Potomac River
- Opequon Quaker Camp, a summer camp near Winchester, Virginia
- Battle of Opequon was a battle fought in Winchester, Virginia during the American Civil War
- Elmwood-on-the-Opequon is a historic residence on the National Register of Historic Places along Opequon Creek
