= William Pinckney Mason =

Confederate States Navy lieutenant (1843-1922)

- Born: William Pinckney Mason; January 10, 1843; Alexandria, Virginia
- Died: December 16, 1922 (aged 79); Rockville, Maryland
- Resting place: Rockville Cemetery, Rockville Maryland
- Occupation: Confederate States Navy officer
- Known for: commander of the iron hull gunboat during the American Civil War
- Spouse: Elizabeth Ruthven McGill
- Children: 3
- Parent(s): Richard Chichester Mason; Lucy Bolling Randolph
- Relatives: great-grandson of George Mason IV

William Pinckney Mason (10 January 1843 – 16 December 1922) was a lieutenant in the Confederate States Navy, ultimately serving as commander of several ironclad gunboats. Mason was a great-grandson of George Mason, author of the Virginia Bill of Rights, and his wife Ann Eilbeck.

== Early life and education ==
Mason was born on 10 January 1843, in Alexandria and was the youngest child of a large family born to Dr. Richard Chichester Mason and his wife Lucy Bolling Randolph.

== American Civil War ==
Mason resigned from the United States Navy as an acting midshipman on 19 April 1861. Mason enlisted in the Confederate States Navy where he became an acting midshipman on 11 June 1861 and served on the CSS United States. On 7 January 1864, Mason was promoted to master in line of promotion and was made 2nd Lieutenant on 2 June 1864. Mason later served as commander of the CSS Beaufort and CSS Virginia II.

== Marriage and children ==
Mason married Elizabeth Ruthven McGill on 29 January 1873 and they had three children:

- Wardlaw McGill Mason (1876–1936)
- Lucius Randolph Mason (28 January 1886–23 November 1984)
- Shirley Carter Mason Prescott (12 October 1891–21 March 1972)

== Later life ==
After a brief illness, Mason died on 16 December 1922 at his residence in Rockville, Maryland at the age of 79. He was buried after 16 December 1923 at Rockville Cemetery in Rockville.

== Ancestry ==
Ancestors of William Pinckney Mason

16. George Mason III
8. George Mason IV
17. Ann Stevens Thomson
4. Thomson Mason
18. William Eilbeck
9. Ann Eilbeck
19. Sarah Edgar
2. Richard Chichester Mason
20. Richard Chichester
10. Richard Chichester
21. Ellen Ball
5. Sarah McCarty Chichester
22. Daniel McCarty
11. Sarah McCarty
23. Sinah Ball
1. William Pinckney Mason
24. William Randolph Jr.
12. Peter Randolph
25. Elizabeth Peyton Beverley
6. Robert Randolph
26. Robert Bolling
13. Lucy Cocke Bolling
27. Anne Cocke
3. Lucy Bolling Randolph
28. John Carter
14. Charles Carter
29. Elizabeth Hill
7. Elizabeth Hill Carter
30. Charles Carter
15. Mary Walker Carter
31. Mary Walker
