= Okeley Manor =

Human settlement in United States of America

Coordinates: 38.761°N 77.120°W

Okeley Manor was an early 19th-century plantation in Fairfax County, Virginia, United States. Okeley, the residence of prominent Alexandria physician Richard Chichester Mason (1793–1869), was one of the principal Mason family estates in Northern Virginia. Mason's plantation house was used as a hospital during the American Civil War and burned to prevent the spread of smallpox.

== History ==
Upon the death of Mason's grandfather George Mason on 7 October 1792, Richard Chichester Mason's father Thomson inherited a portion of the Gunston Hall estate. Around 1817, Thomson Mason divided the property into two plantations: Dogue Run farm for his son Richard C. Mason and Hunting Creek farm adjacent to Mount Vernon for his elder brother Thomson Francis Mason (1785–1838).

Mason and his family began living on Dogue Run farm sometime before 1834 in Okeley Manor, the mansion he built. Although much older than most soldiers, Mason served with the Confederate States Army in Richmond during the American Civil War. He returned to Okeley Manor at age 72 to find the residence, used during the war as a hospital, had been burned to the ground to prevent the spread of smallpox. Mason also found that "a negro and an Irishman" were in possession of the Okeley property.

By 1880, his son Beverley Randolph Mason had recovered the land. He was living in a house he built on the hill. Beverley's descendants sold Okeley in 1916, ending Mason ownership of any of the original Gunston Hall land parcel.

The two parcels of original Mason land were used for farming in the early 20th century. After having been reassembled and years of being used for light industrial purposes, much of the land was sold by the Interior Department to Fairfax County in 1975 for park purposes. It is now part of Huntley Meadows Park. A boardwalk was built for access to wetland areas, as well as other walk and bikeways.

== Events ==
- Beverley Randolph Mason (1834–1910), son of Dr. Richard Chichester Mason and Lucy Bolling Randolph, was born at Okeley Manor on 1 September 1834.
- Susan Josephine Beverley Mason (1888–1962), daughter of Beverley Randolph Mason and Elizabeth Harrison Nelson, was born at Okeley Manor on 17 January 1888.
