= Sunnyside Farm (Leetown, West Virginia) =

Historic house in West Virginia, United States

- U.S. National Register of Historic Places
- U.S. Historic district
- Location within West Virginia Location within the United States
- Location: Kearneysville, West Virginia
- Coordinates: 39.37419°N 77.90888°W
- Built: 1899
- Architectural style: Colonial Revival
- NRHP reference No.: 99000285
- Added to NRHP: March 18, 1999

Sunnyside Farm is a farm near Kearneysville, West Virginia, United States, that is principally associated with William Fulk's dairy farming operation. The farm has a full complement of buildings associated with dairying, including the main house (1914), smokehouse (1914), milk house (C.1899). a small log house, chicken house (1920), garage (1920), tenant house (1920), hog shed (c.1915), pig house (c.1899), barn (1911, reconstructed after a fire in 1985) and silo (1911).
