= Rockville Cemetery (Maryland) =

Cemetery in Montgomery County, United States

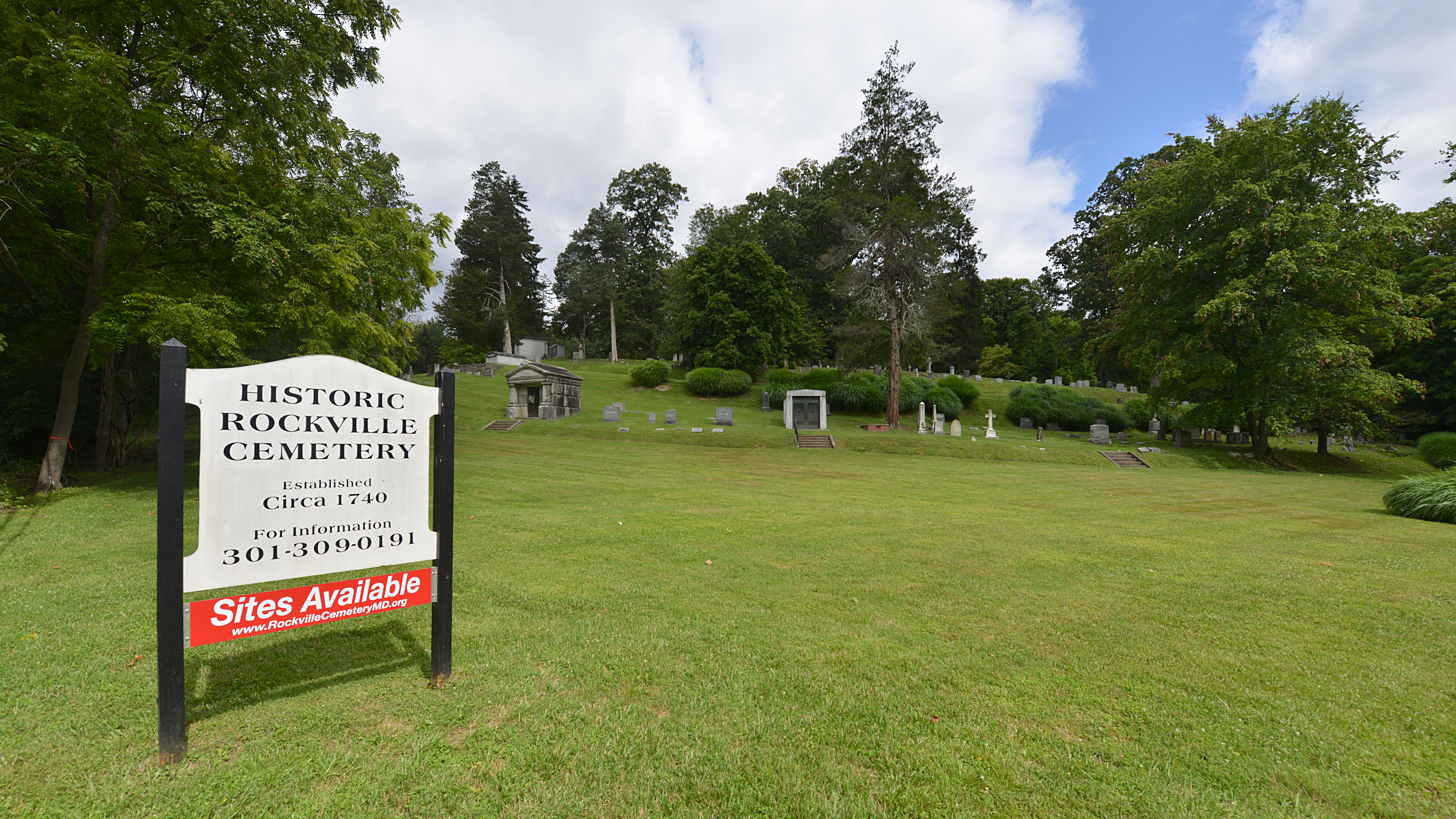
- Rockville Cemetery on July 3, 2021.

Details
- Established: ca. 1740
- Location: Rockville, Maryland
- Country: United States
- Coordinates: 39°05′03″N 077°07′32″W
- Type: Non-profit
- Style: Upper/western section: Rural cemetery Lower/eastern section: Lawn cemetery
- Owned by: Rockville Cemetery Association, Inc.
- Size: 26.64 acres (10.78 ha)
- No. of interments: ca. 4,600
- Website: https://www.rockvillecemeterymd.org/
- Find a Grave: Rockville Cemetery
- The Political Graveyard: Rockville Cemetery

Rockville Cemetery is a cemetery in Rockville, Maryland, United States. It is the oldest burial ground in the Rockville community. It sometimes is referred to as Rockville Union Cemetery.

== Physical features ==
Rockville Cemetery is located on the eastern edge of Rockville at 1350 Baltimore Road, adjacent to the Rockville Civic Center. It occupies 26.64 acres (10.78 ha) in two sections, an older, western or upper section of 7.7 acres (3.1 ha) and a newer, eastern or lower section of almost 16.9 acres (6.8 ha). The western or upper section is an example of the "rural cemetery" movement with a picturesque landscape, curving roads, monuments, and plantings, while the eastern or lower section is a lawn cemetery. The two sections are divided by both a stream and a dramatic change in elevation between the higher western and lower eastern sections.

== History ==
The Anglican Prince George's Parish established a chapel in what is now the western or upper section of Rockville Cemetery in 1738, and by around 1740 a graveyard had been established as burials began on the chapel's grounds; the oldest surviving stone grave marker dates to 1752. Almost a century later, Christ Episcopal Church moved from the old chapel into the City of Rockville, but burials continued at the graveyard.

Ownership of the cemetery changed in 1880, when five Protestant denominations incorporated the Rockville Cemetery Association of Montgomery County and made the cemetery a community burial space open to all. By that time, the neglected cemetery had fallen into disrepair and become a veritable wilderness, but during the 1880s the new ownership revitalized interest in its care and maintenance. A women's group, the Rockville Union Cemetery Association, took responsibility for the management and maintenance of the cemetery and beautified the property. In 1889, a caretaker's cottage and outbuilding were constructed at the cemetery.

Demand for space led to the expansion of Rockville Cemetery to include its lower, eastern section, which was laid out in 1936. The City of Rockville annexed the cemetery in 1984.

Interest in maintenance of the cemetery waned again, and by the late 20th century it again had fallen into disrepair. Public outcry over its physical condition led to the incorporation in 2001 of the nonprofit Rockville Cemetery Association, Inc. The association reinvigorated efforts to maintain the property and improve its appearance, overseeing repairs to the 1889 caretaker's cottage and outbuilding, renovation of the cemetery's internal roads, drainage improvements, the repair of hundreds of damaged and fallen tombstones, and the installation of road signs to direct visitors to the graves of their loved ones and to those of notable people buried at the cemetery.

The Rockville Cemetery Association's financial position improved significantly between 2014 and 2020 thanks to substantial growth in grave sales and burials. During these years, the Association continued to convert all of the cemetery's records to a digital format, standardized grave site codification, created high-quality section maps, expanded and enhanced the cemetery's website, refurbished and upgraded the caretaker's cottage and gave it a public water connection, completed the planting of more than 30 trees, and expanded the cemetery's program of community events.

== Notable burials ==
More than 4,600 people are buried at Rockville Cemetery. Notable burials include:

- Upton Beall (1770–1827), second clerk of the court of Montgomery County
- Richard Johns Bowie (1807–1881), U.S Congressman (1849–1853), chief judge of the Maryland Court of Appeals (1861–1867)
- Stephen Clusky Cromwell, Jr. (1925–2015), first president of the Rockville Cemetery Association (2001–2014) and descendant of Rebecca Viers
- John G. England (1845–1913), mayor of Rockville (1894–1896)
- John Trumbull Garvin (1892-1943), American diplomat
- John Harding (1685–1752), whose tombstone is the oldest remaining stone marker in the cemetery
- Walter Johnson (1887–1946), Hall-of-Fame pitcher for the Washington Senators, manager of the Senators and the Cleveland Indians, and Montgomery County commissioner
- William Pinckney Mason (1843–1922), Confederate States Navy officer
- Paul Peck (1889–1912), aviation pioneer
- E. Barrett Prettyman (1891–1971), senior judge of the U.S. Court of Appeals for the District of Columbia Circuit (1962–1971)
- E. Barrett Prettyman Jr. (1925–2016), prominent Washington, D.C., lawyer, son of E. Barrett Prettyman
- Members of the Pumphrey family of carpenters and undertakers
- Edward Elisha Stonestreet (1830–1903), Rockville physician and town councilman
- Rebecca Thomas Viers née Bialys (1833–1918), leader of the Rockville Union Cemetery Association

The author F. Scott Fitzgerald was buried in Rockville Cemetery upon his death in 1940, as was his wife Zelda Fitzgerald, who died in 1948. Their remains were moved to Saint Mary's Cemetery, also in Rockville, in 1975.
