= Little Fork Church =

Historic church in Virginia, US

- U.S. National Register of Historic Places
- Virginia Landmarks Register
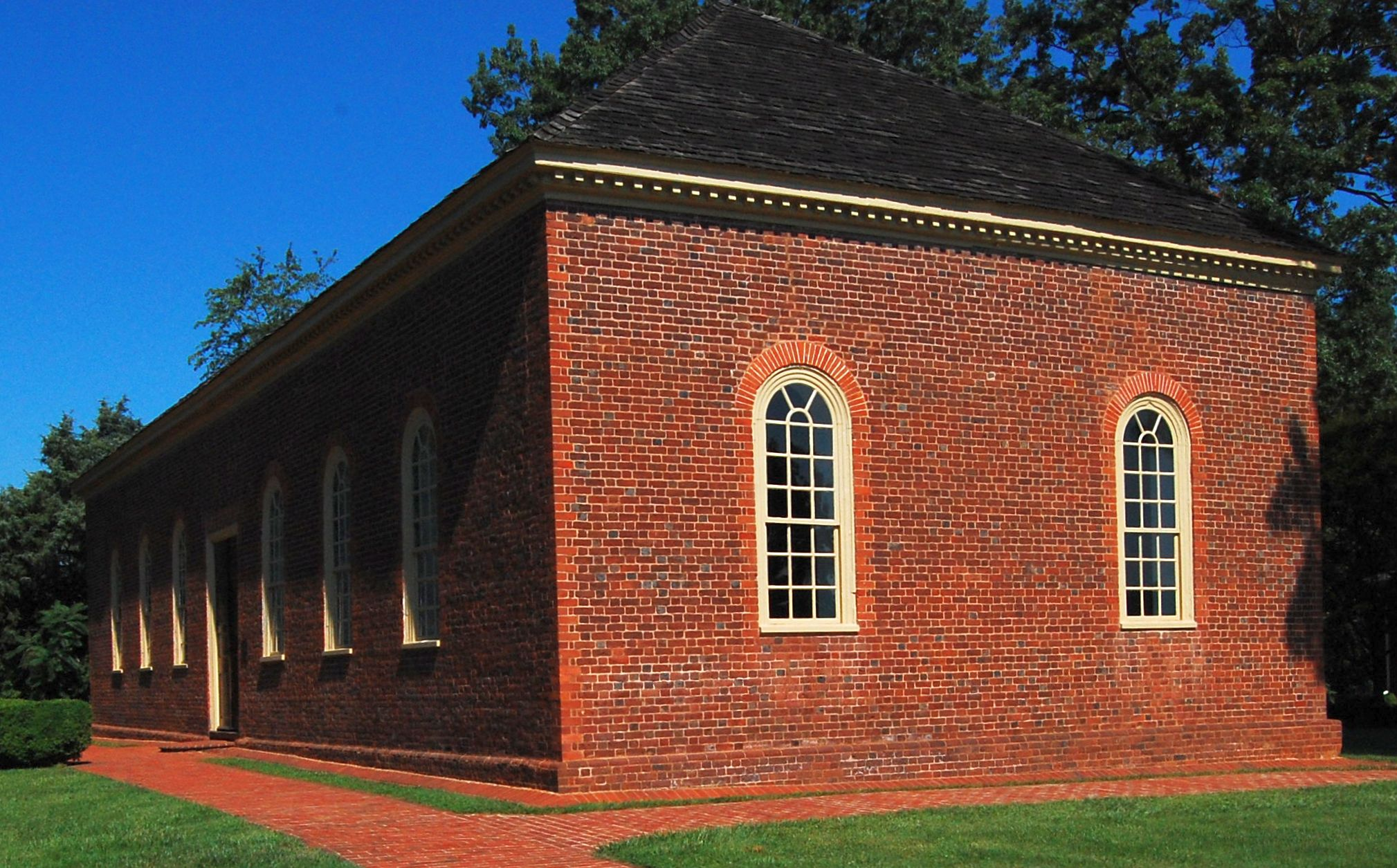
- Little Fork Church: South-east View

- Location within Virginia Location within the United States
- Nearest city: Culpeper, Virginia
- Coordinates: 38°35′59″N 77°57′18″W
- Built: 1776
- Architect: John Ariss
- Architectural style: Colonial
- NRHP reference No.: 69000234
- VLR No.: 023-0013

Significant dates
- Added to NRHP: November 12, 1969
- Designated VLR: May 13, 1969

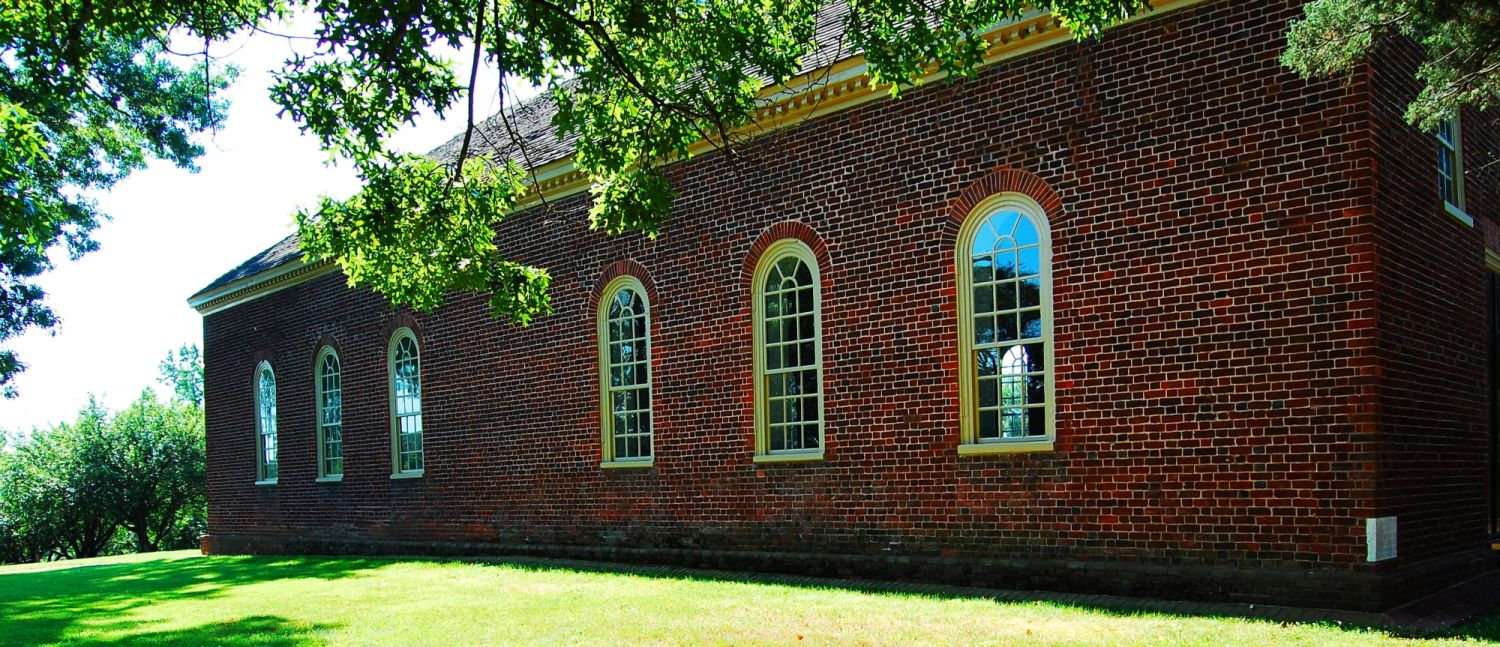
Little Fork Church: North Facade

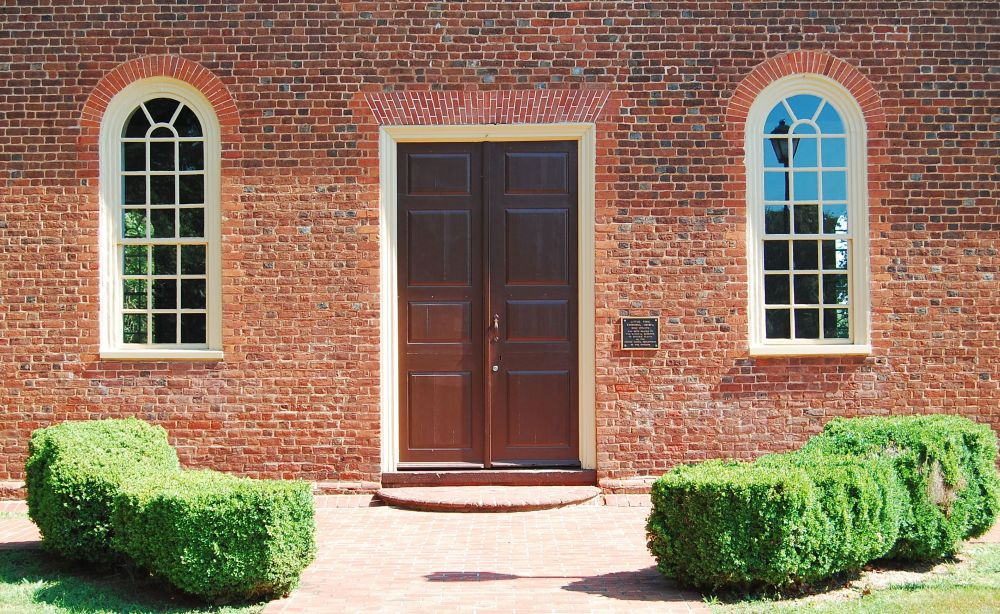
Little Fork Church: South Doorway

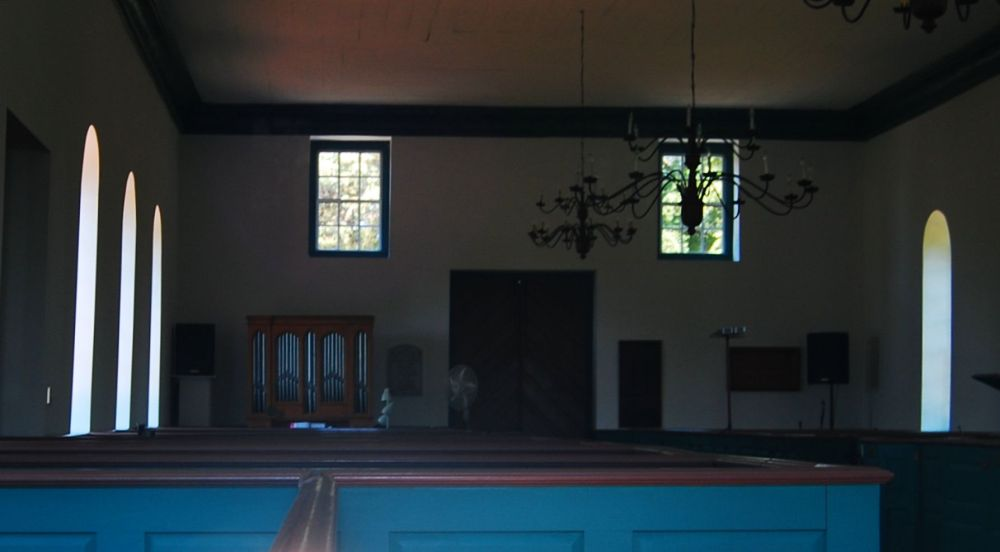
Little Fork Church: Interior Looking west

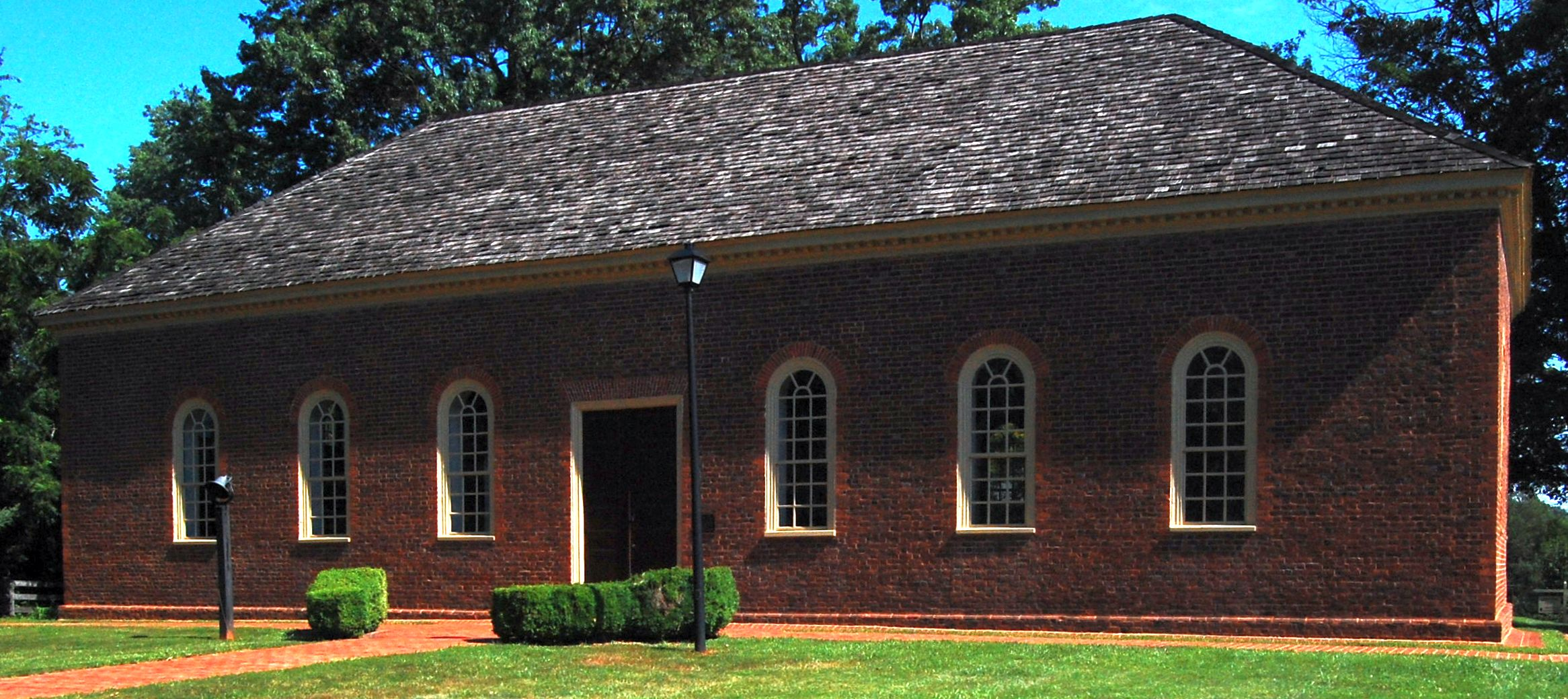
Little Fork Church: Full South Facade

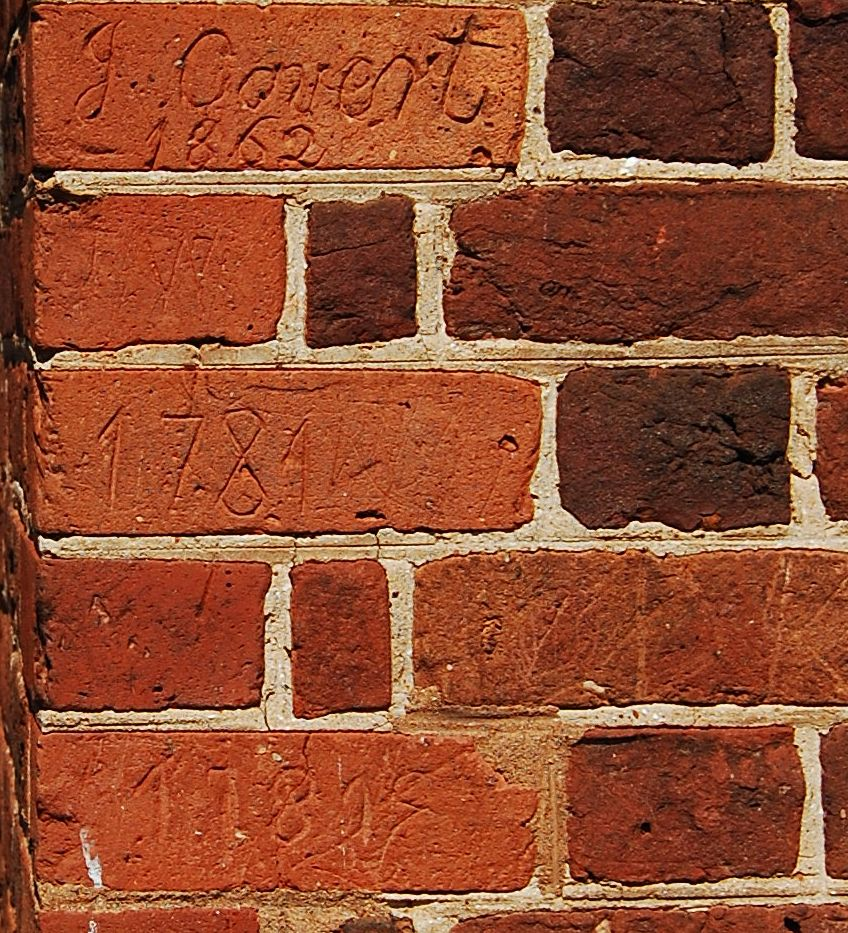
Little Fork Church: Initials on SE corner bricks

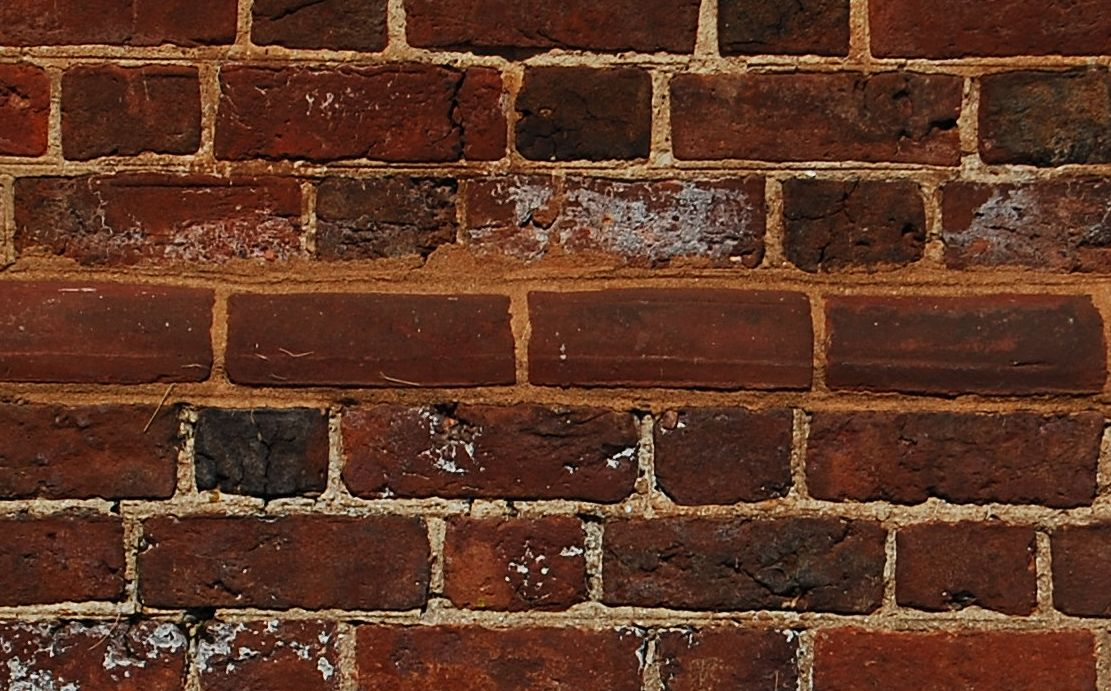
Little Fork Church: Bricks and water table on NE facade

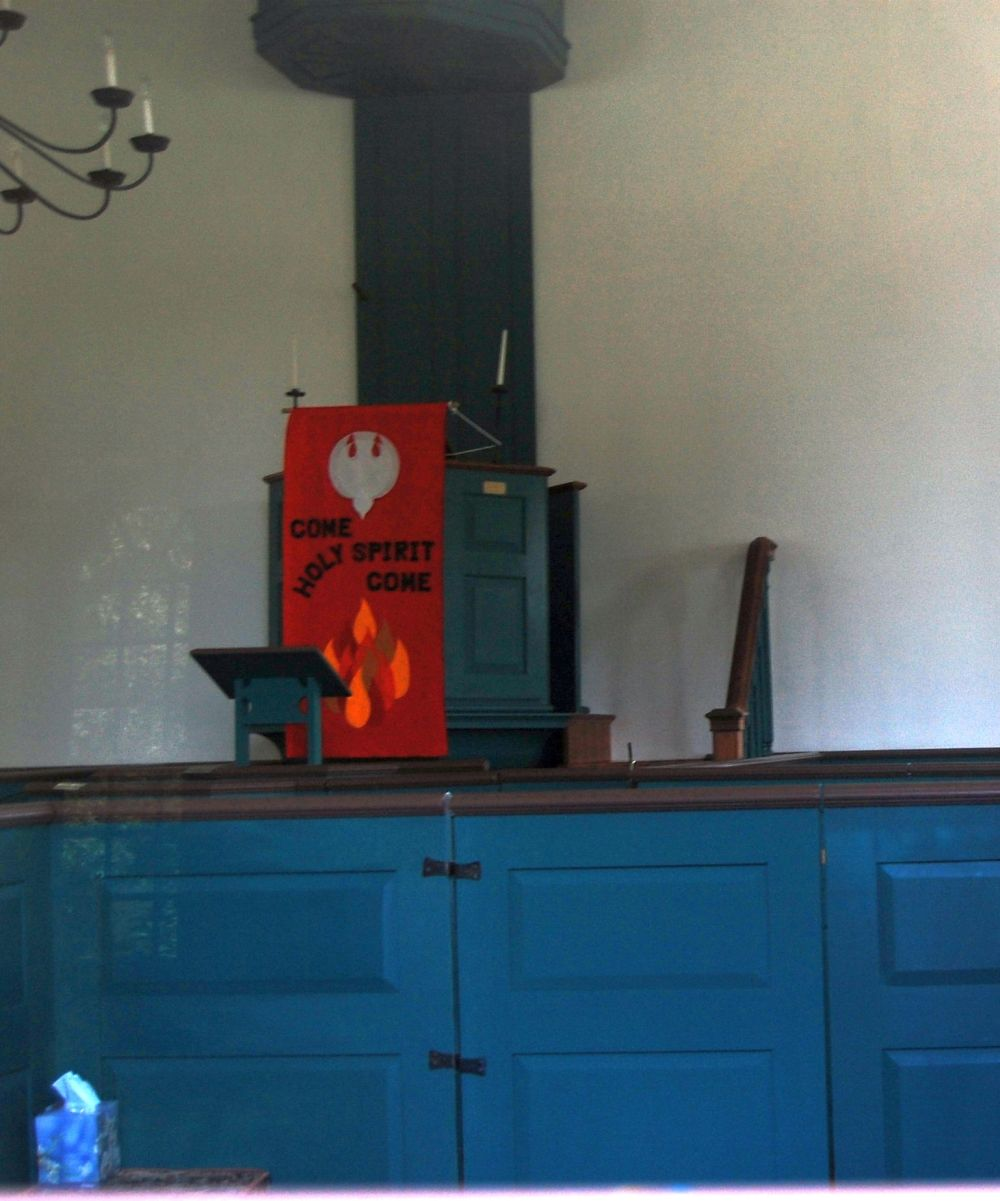
Little Fork Church: Pulpit

Little Fork Church stands on a low knoll to the east of State Route 229 nine miles north of Culpeper, Virginia in a small grove of trees that enhances its naturally pastoral setting. The name Little Fork is taken from the junction of the Hazel and Rappahannock Rivers relatively close to the edifice. It is a large room church being 83 1/2 feet east–west and 33 1/2 feet north–south. Unlike most rectangular churches in Virginia, the pulpit stands directly north of the southern entrance door that is placed in the middle of the southern wall rather than in the far southeast of the building. Thus it shows some of the architectural characteristics of middle colony meeting houses such as those in Delaware as well as the Virginia Vernacular Church and the deep church.

== Parish affiliation ==
Following the British retreat from Virginia this colonial church was abandoned by the Anglicans. Located in the area known as the Village Of Oak Shade, it was used by Methodists and referred to as Oak Shade Church. Descendants still living in the Culpeper and Rappahannock area continue to refer to the church as the "Oak Shade Church". The Oak Shade Church had a cemetery where burials were performed in the early 1800s, that can no longer be located on church grounds. When the Methodist congregation offered to renovate the decaying building, ownership was then reclaimed by the Episcopalians. A full-scale renovation took place in the 1970s, including relocation of the memorial to the local Little Fork Rangers cavalry unit, to the side yard of the church.

It was attached to St. Mark's Parish that, like most early parishes in Virginia, changed its suzerainty and geographic range as counties became established by partitioning earlier counties due to population growth or shifts. Its creation and history are:

- St. Mark's Parish formed from St. George's Parish 1730-31
- St. Thomas's Parish in Orange County partitioned from St. Mark's Parish in 1740
- Culpeper County formed out of Orange County in 1748

Little Fork was a chapel of ease for the parish, and thus was never the lower, or main, parish church. It is the only remaining colonial church in the county.

== General architecture ==
It is a church of late construction, begun in 1773 and completed in 1776, having characteristics of a rectangular church combined with the contemporary, two story churches of Northern Virginia that stretch in a geographic swath from Falls Church to St. Paul's, King George County. It retains elements such as orientation, south and west doorways, compass windows, and Flemish bond, yet includes elements such as a deep church configuration, a hipped roof, movement of southern door to the center of the southern wall, classical door pediments, and a pulpit on the northern wall opposite the southern doorway. It lacks elements of deep churches in Northern Virginia such as two tiered windows and cruciform structure. The general doorway plan and placement of the pulpit is remarkably similar to that of Lamb's Creek Church, designed by the same architect, and resembles several extant middle colony meeting houses.

Unlike most colonial churches, the designer and builder, John Ariss (circa 1725–1799) is known and designed another similar religious edifice, Lamb's Creek Church, that is a virtual twin of this building. It replaces a wooden church built on or near the same site that burned to the ground in 1773. An older wooden church reportedly burned in 1750. Instead of another wooden church, apparently planned by Edmund Bass who was paid five pounds for his work, this brick edifice was erected. However, the parish's own history states that William Phillips built the church for a fee of 35,000 pounds of tobacco and John Voss designed it. Contributing to the restoration was Milton L. Grigg, a noted architect; he was also retained in the restoration of other colonial churches and colonial Williamsburg.

It derives its name, Little Fork, from the junction of the Hazel and Rappahannock Rivers that are nearby.

=== Virtual Tour ===
Take a walk both inside and out at using the Google Maps 360 Photo Path https://www.google.com/maps/@38.5997878,-77.9545563,18.43z Click the Pegman to show all 360 photo locations.

=== Bricks ===
The bricks are laid in Flemish bond both in the water table and the walls and show occasional use of glazed brick in both headers and stretchers. The walls are 22" thick. Queen closers and rubbed brick are present at the corners, compass windows, and doorways. The transition from the water table to the walls is via an ovolo, or convex, molded brick. It is a large, deep church as already stated, approaching the limit of audibility in its 83-foot length. The modillion cornice, large toothed decorated eaves, are probably of colonial origin.

=== Interior ===
The interior, destroyed during the Civil War by Union Cavalry for firewood, was restored in 1871 and 1976. The last restoration is a painstakingly accurate restoration of the original interior. It consists of box pews painted colonial blue-green with dark wood tops, the original reredos on the eastern wall, and a lectern under the "wine-glass" pulpit high on the north-central wall, directly opposite the southern doorway. In 1963, Rawlings reported a plaster line indicating that the original wainscoting was taller than that installed in the nineteenth century restoration. This is apparently corrected in the recent repairs. The elaborate reredos contains a central tablet bearing the Lord's Prayer, the Decalogue, and the Apostles' Creed in modern gold lettering on a black background. The cornice and cross are modern additions rather than colonial features. The box pews were constructed to keep out winter drafts, and parishioners used foot warmers during winters. The flat wooden ceiling is a restoration as are most of the floorboards; Rawlings believes the floor was originally lower than the present level.

=== Windows and doorways ===
The 8' 8" tall windows are of typical compass style with round arches of voussiors, rubbed brick, and queen closers. There are fourteen compass windows in all. These windows, located on the south, east, and north are identical, while the two windows on the west wall are small rectangular openings with flat arches, characteristic of openings for galleries in other churches. There is no evidence for a western gallery in this church (as in its sister church, Lamb's Creek, that lacks the western windows entirely). The doorways are most likely not the original form: the church probably had classical pediments like Pohick Church or Lamb's Creek Church as evidenced by brick repairs surrounding the doors. The original door openings were approximately 6' 7" wide, and the southern entrance was probably the main one. The doorways themselves are also not of colonial age.

== Historical events ==
The Little Fork Rangers, Co. D, 4th Virginia Cavalry drilled at the church in 1861 and, as already mentioned, a stable for Union cavalry in 1863 when the interior was destroyed. A "contrite Union officer" reputedly sent $100 to the church after the war to replace the destroyed pews. A memorial to the Little Fork Rangers stands south of the church. There were no colonial graves near the present church, although there seems to be the start of a memorial garden cemetery to the east of the building among a copse of small trees. Several Spindle family members were buried here in the early 1800s. Small cedar trees sporadically surround the church that is embellished by lawn encircling it.

== See also ==
- National Register of Historic Places listings in Culpeper County, Virginia

== Bibliography ==
- Brock, Henry I. (1930). Colonial Churches in Virginia. Richmond, Va.: Dale press.
- Meade, William (1995). Old Churches, Ministers, and Families of Virginia. Philadelphia: Genealogical Publishing Co, Inc, 1847.
- "Little Fork Episcopal Church." History Page at <https://web.archive.org/web/20080511175211/http://www.littleforkchurch.net/>.
- Mason, George C. (1945). Colonial Churches of Tidewater Virginia. Richmond, Virginia: Whittet and Shepperson.
- Rawlings, James S. (1963). Virginia's Colonial Churches: An Architectural Guide. Richmond, Virginia: Garrett and Massie.
- Upton, Dell [1986] (1997). Holy Things and Profane: Anglican Parish Churches in Colonial Virginia. New Haven and London: Yale University Press.
