= Fairfield (Berryville, Virginia) =

Historic house in Virginia, United States

- Fairfield Farms
- U.S. National Register of Historic Places
- Virginia Landmarks Register
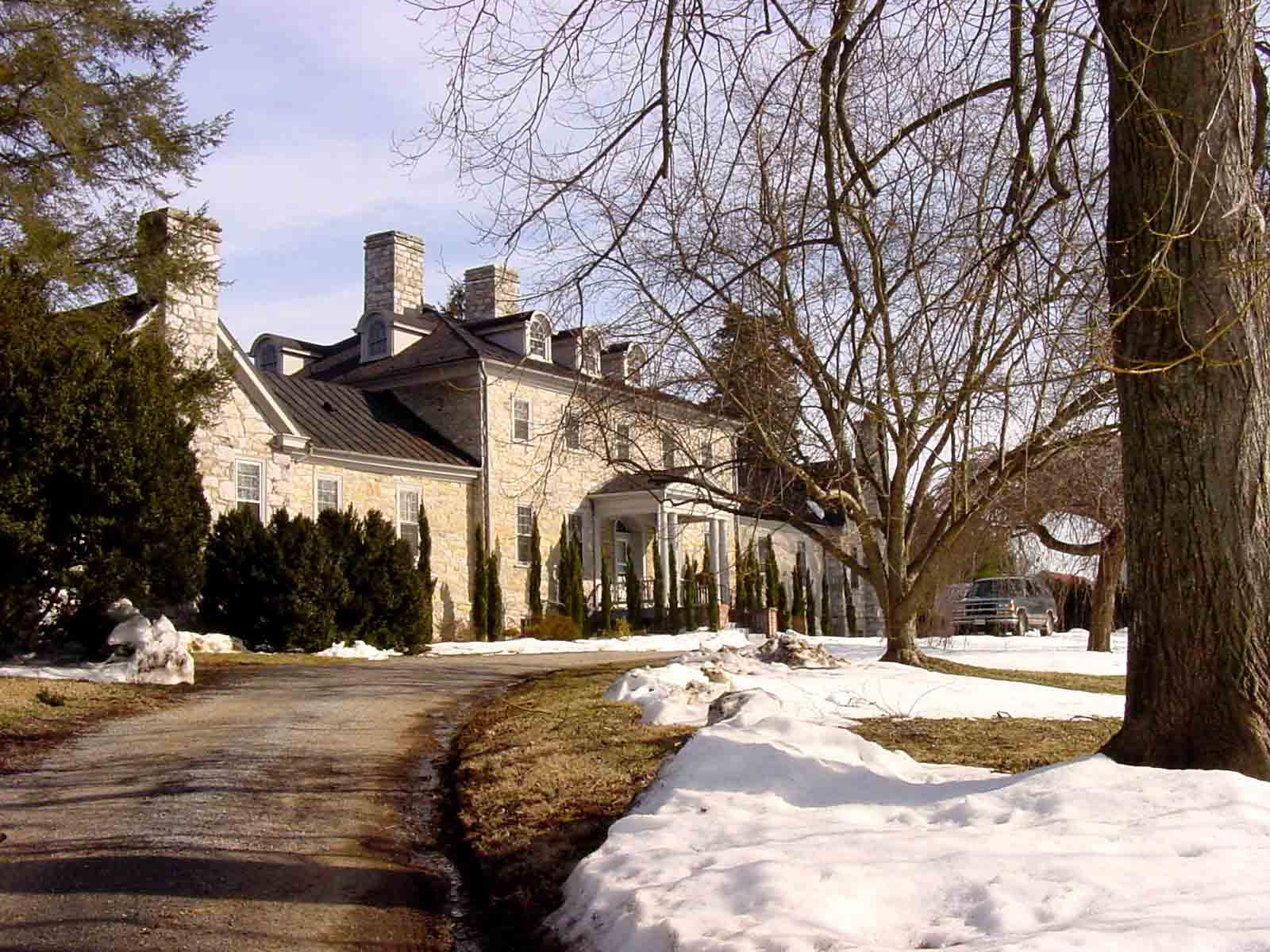
- Fairfield, February 2007

- Location within Northern Virginia Location within Virginia Location within the United States
- Location: E of jct. of Rtes. 340 and 610, near Berryville, Virginia
- Coordinates: 39°11′5″N 77°55′8″W
- Area: 560 acres (230 ha)
- Built: 1770
- Architect: Ariss, John
- Architectural style: Georgian
- NRHP reference No.: 70000787
- VLR No.: 021-0029

Significant dates
- Added to NRHP: February 26, 1970
- Designated VLR: December 2, 1969

Fairfield Farms is a historic estate house located near Berryville, Clarke County, Virginia. It was built in 1768, and designed by architect John Ariss and built for Warner Washington, first cousin to George Washington. During his surveying for Lord Fairfax, George Washington helped survey and layout the property for John Aris. It is a five-part complex with a 2 1/2-story hipped-roof central block having walls of irregular native limestone ashlar throughout. It is in the Georgian style. Located on the property are a contributing large brick, frame and stone barn and an overseer's house.

In February 2018, Fairfield Farms was purchased by developer Charles Paret, a Virginia native, who was unsuccessful in his endeavor to develop the property.

Fairfield was listed on the National Register of Historic Places in 1970.
