= Martha Anne Woodrum Zillhardt =

American aviator

- Born: Martha Anne Woodrum; September 1, 1916; Roanoke, Virginia
- Died: May 22, 2002 (aged 85); Roanoke, Virginia
- Occupation: aviator
- Spouse: Jack Zillhardt

Martha Anne Woodrum Zillhardt (1916–2002) was an American aviator. She ran a successful flight school and served as the first woman president of the Virginia Aviation Trade Council.

== Biography ==
Zillhardt née Woodrum was born on September 1, 1916, in Roanoke, Virginia. She was the daughter of Clifton A. Woodrum, Sr. Martha Hancock Woodrum and Clifton A. Woodrum a United States Representative. She attended Gunston Hall School in Washington, D.C.

Zillhardt earned her private pilot, instructors and commercial ratings in 1940, becoming the first woman in Virginia to earn an instrument rating pilot's license. she went on to operate the Woodrum Flying Service flight school and charter service. In 1949 she organized the Roanoke Jaycees All State Air Show. In 1950 she won the 1st Beechcraft Bonanza trophy (pictured) in the All-Woman Transcontinental Air Race (Powder Puff Derby), finishing 18th overall.

In 1953 she married Jack Zillhardt. In 1960 she became president of the Virginia Aviation Trades Association, the first woman to hold that office. In 1985 Zillhardt was inducted into the Virginia Aviation Hall of Fame. She died on May 2, 2002, in Roanoke.

In 2018 the Virginia Capitol Foundation announced that Zillhardt's name would be included on the Virginia Women's Monument's glass Wall of Honor.
