= John VanMetre House =

Historic house in West Virginia, United States

- U.S. National Register of Historic Places
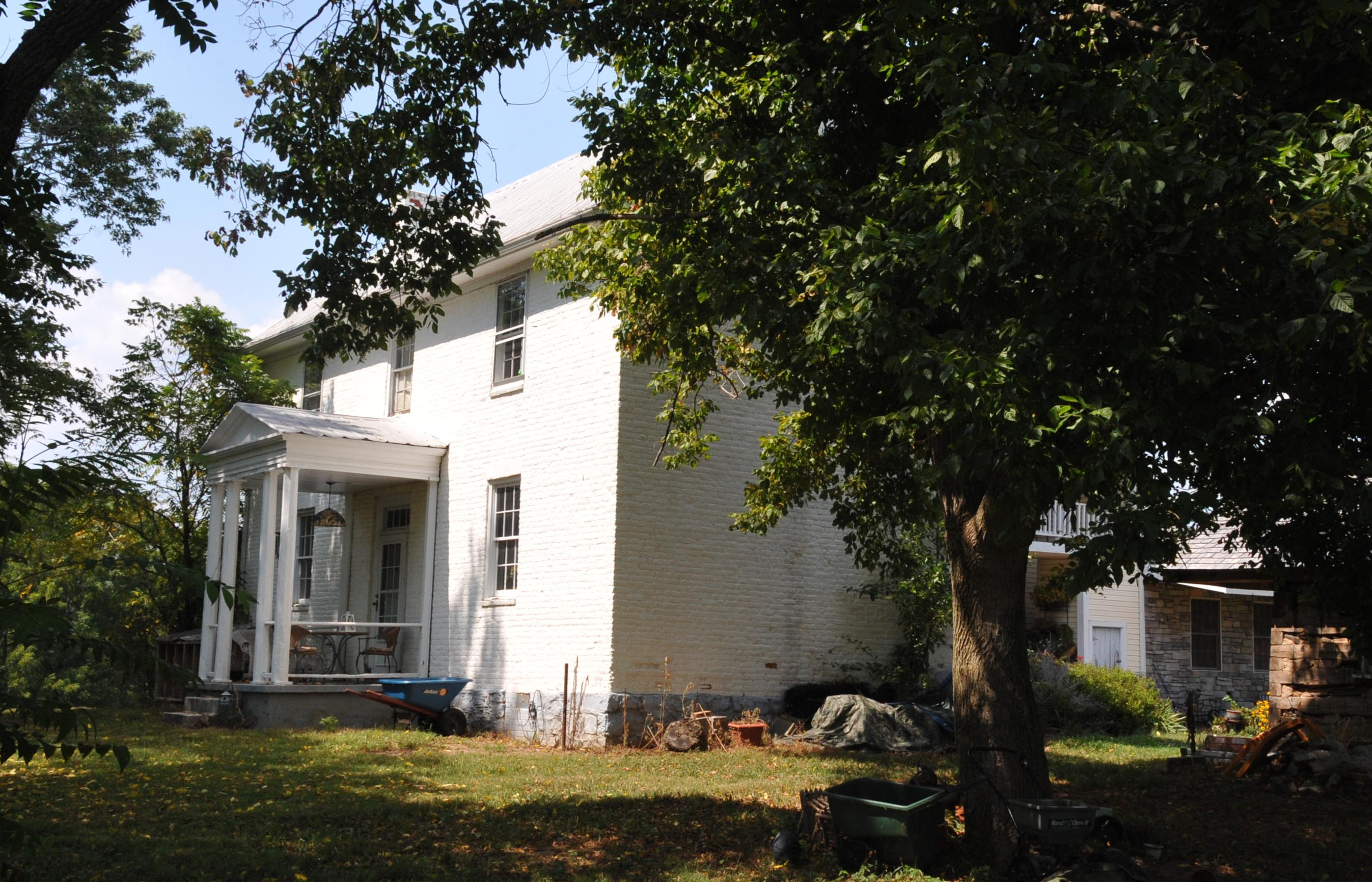

- Location within West Virginia Location within the United States
- Location: 177 Elsie Dr., Kearneysville, West Virginia
- Coordinates: 39°24′58″N 77°56′13″W
- Built: ca. 1780
- Architectural style: Federal
- NRHP reference No.: 04000033
- Added to NRHP: February 11, 2004

The John VanMetre House is a log and brick Federal-style house built in Kearneysville, Berkeley County, West Virginia around 1780, and enlarged with a log ell about 1800. Also on the property is a log smoke house, timber frame barn, and two sheds.

It was listed on the National Register of Historic Places in 2004.
