= Robert Townshend Thompson =

American lawyer and politician (1792–1887)

Member of the Virginia House of Delegates from Fairfax County
- In office November 16, 1816 – December 2, 1825 Serving with John C. Hunter, John W. Ashton, James Sangster, Augustine J. Smith, John Moore, Richard C. Mason
- Preceded by: Alexander Waugh
- Succeeded by: Benedict M. Lane

Personal details
- Born: 1792 Fairfax County, Virginia
- Died: August 9, 1887 (aged 94–95) Vienna, Fairfax County, Virginia
- Spouse: Leah W. Kitchen
- Relations: Lund Washington (uncle)
- Children: Marion
- Parent(s): William Thompson, Ann Washington Stith Thompson
- Occupation: lawyer, planter, politician

Robert Townshend Thompson (1792–August 9, 1887) was a Virginia lawyer, planter and politician in Fairfax County, Virginia, which he represented in the Virginia House of Delegates for nearly a decade (1816–1825). Thompson married Leah W. Kitchen in 1822 and operated a 870 acre farm. He died at the age of 88.

== Early and family life ==
He was the only son born to the former Ann Washington (1761–1824) and her second husband, Fairfax County merchant William Thompson (d. 1799). The boy's middle name honors his maternal grandfather Townshend Washington (1705–1743). His uncle Lund Washington was the longtime estate manager for George Washington, and another uncle, Laurence Washington (1735-1799) who died the same year as his wife Catherine Foote (and who did not have children) gave his Belmont estate in Fairfax County to Robert when he reached 18 years of age, subject to a life interest of his mother Ann, and the emancipation of certain slaves in 1801 and others when they reached 25 years of age. In addition to operating a store near the Occoquan River at the tobacco port called Colchester, his father also was a captain in the Fairfax County militia, and held various appointments to appraise estates, including that of prominent planter George Mason (which is now lost), who also owned land fronting Belmont Bay. His father wrote a will shortly before his death, naming his wife as executor on behalf of their three children, but not naming them in the document. His sisters Elizabeth Lund Thompson (b. 1787?) and Catherine Foote Thompson (b. 1794?) would have inherited the Belmont plantation had Robert died before reaching 18 years old.

Rev. Robert Townshend Thompson married Leah W. Kitchen, daughter of Thompson Kitchen of Fairfax County on May 9, 1822, in a service conducted by Rev. James Reid. Although the date of her death has been forgotten, and it occurred before the 1860 census, she may have been alive in 1856, when her father wrote his last will and testament (which indicated she had already received her inheritance).

== Career ==
Upon reaching legal age, Thompson received a deed of gift from his mother. He operated an approximately 870 acre farm, part of Belmont Plantation in Fairfax County near the Occoquan River. In the 1820 U.S. Federal Census, Thompson owned 19 slaves, and his household also included two free blacks.

In 1816, Robert T. Thompson was nominated to become a first lieutenant to command a horse militia troop, part of the 60th regiment of Virginia militia. A year later he was recommended to become a captain to replace Thomas Wheeler, who gave up his commission.

In 1819, local officials recommended Thompson to become one of the justices of the peace for the county, and a year later, on September 18, 1820, Robert T. Thompson took the oath required of the justices of the peace. However, he resigned, possibly in order to practice as an attorney before that court. He received a law license and took an oath as attorney on October 22, 1821.

Fairfax County voters elected Robert T. Thompson as one of their delegates (part-time) to the Virginia House of Delegates in 1816, and continued re-electing him until 1825. In 1824, delegate Thompson objected to a legislative committee's recommendation for the sale of an infant child born in the Fairfax jail to Hannah Smith, the daughter of Bushrod Washington's life-long personal servant Oliver Smith and who had been convicted of trying to poison Washington's overseer in 1821. On November 25, 1825, Thompson was jailed because pending a court case about some sort of disturbance and Robert Allison, Benjamin Cross, Charles Coleman and Hiram Carter became his securities for his keeping the peace pending the hearing, each posting $12.50 for his $50 bond. In May 1828, creditors foreclosed a mortgage Thompson had given on Belmont, and conducted an auction of the remaining property.

Thompson appears to have left Fairfax County by 1829 (possibly for the growing District of Columbia across the Potomac River). In 1850, the Alexandria Gazette published a marriage notice for his daughter Marion (a/k/a Mary), who married Isaac Leeds of Philadelphia (actually Burlington County, New Jersey across the Delaware River) on the preceding February 28, in a service conducted by Rev. Lanaham. The Leeds family lived the rest of their lives in Fairfax County, through and long after the Civil War; their firstborn son Charles T. Leeds (1862-1912) shared his grandfather's middle name, and their second son his first name, Robert Herbert Leeds (1862-1925). They lived near Dranesville on the Leesburg Pike (on the other side of the large county from the former Belmont plantation). The 1860 census shows Isaac Leeds as heading a large household with his wife, their children, as well as this man, his second wife and their young daughter. In a census entry a decade earlier, farmer and household head Robert Thompson's gender is given as "female"[sic], his middle initial is spelled out as "Tuel", his birth year given as 1799 and birthplace as the District of Columbia (which didn't exist at the time) and his first wife Leah's name instead given as "Leo", and they lived in that western section of Fairfax County with several adult sons and underage daughters. The 1860 census also has the dual household living around Dranesville, by which time Thompson's occupation is as a "saddler" rather than "farmer" and his middle initial seems "S". The 1870 census also gives his correct gender and lists him as a "harnessmaker".

== Death and legacy ==
Although one source indicates R.T. Thompson died in 1835, the Alexandria Gazette published a death notice for the "old and respected citizen" Robert T. Thompson, aged 88 years, who died at his home near Vienna (a few miles east of Dranesville).
