= J. S. Mason =

American politician

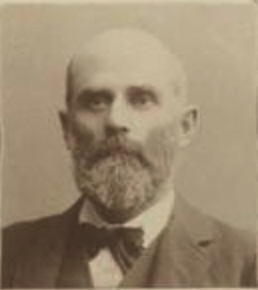

Member of the Virginia House of Delegates for Loudoun and Fauquier
- In office December 4, 1889 – December 6, 1893
- Preceded by: John W. Kincheloe
- Succeeded by: Eppa Hunton Jr.

Personal details
- Born: John Stevens Mason; August 18, 1839 Fairfax, Virginia, U.S.
- Died: April 3, 1918 (aged 78) Marshall, Virginia, U.S.
- Party: Democratic
- Spouse: Eliza Randolph Beverley (m. 1866)
- Parent: Richard C. Mason (father)

Military service
- Allegiance: Confederate States
- Branch/service: Confederate States Army
- Years of service: 1861–1865
- Battles/wars: American Civil War

John Stevens Mason (August 18, 1839 – April 3, 1918) was an American politician who represented Loudoun and Fauquier counties in the Virginia House of Delegates from 1889 to 1893. Through his father, Richard Chichester Mason, he was a direct descendant of George Mason.
