= Bena, Virginia =

Unincorporated community in Virginia, United States

- Unincorporated community
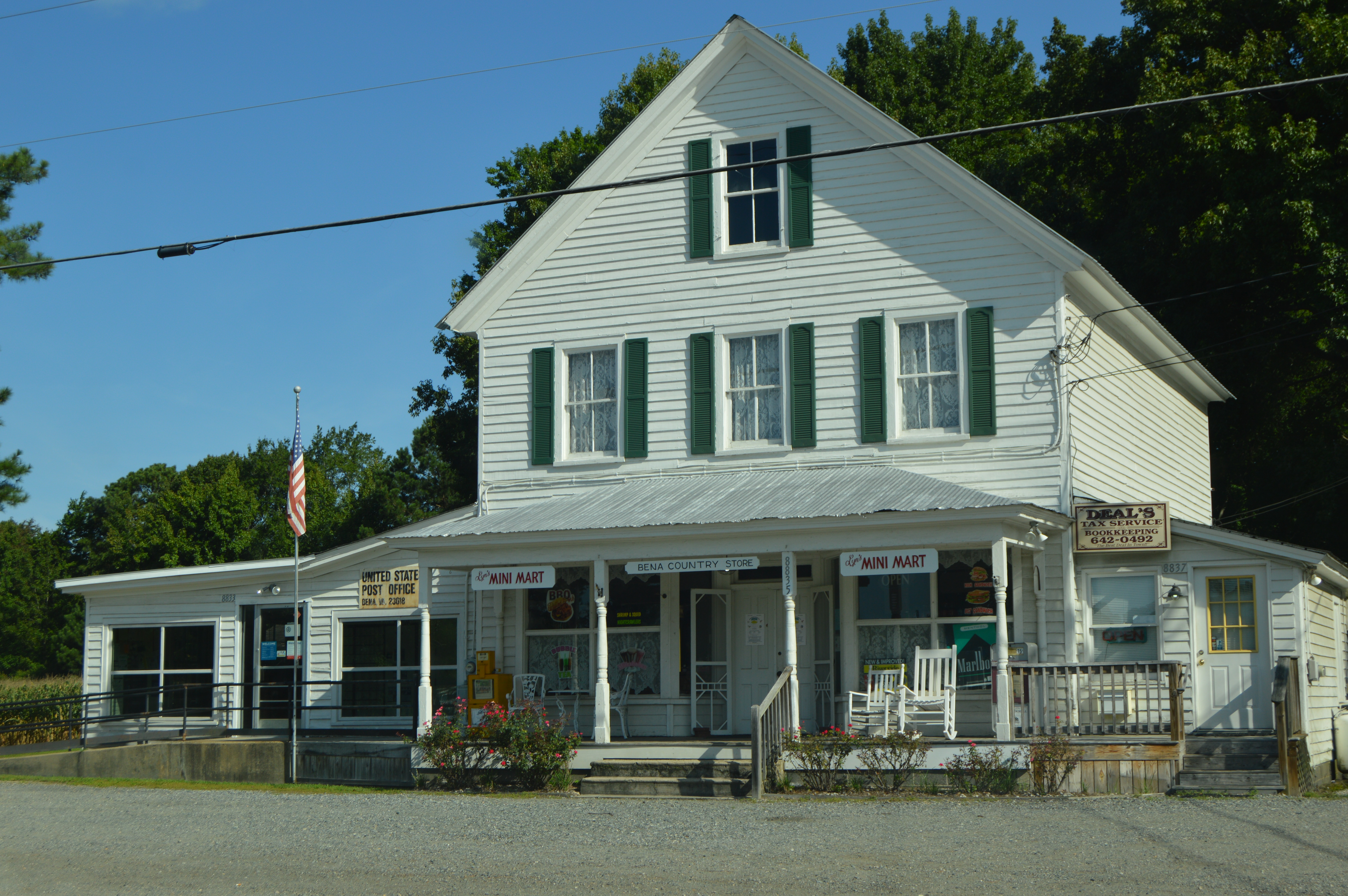
- Post office

- Location within Virginia Location within the United States
- Coordinates: 37°16′16″N 76°27′20″W
- Country: United States
- State: Virginia
- County: Gloucester
- Elevation: 7 ft (2.1 m)
- Time zone: UTC-5 (Eastern (EST))
  - Summer (DST): UTC-4 (EDT)
- ZIP code: 23018
- Area code: 804
- GNIS feature ID: 1477108

Bena is an unincorporated community in Gloucester County, Virginia, United States. The community is located on Virginia State Route 216, 2.5 miles (4.0 km) east-northeast of Gloucester Point. Bena has a post office with ZIP code 23018.

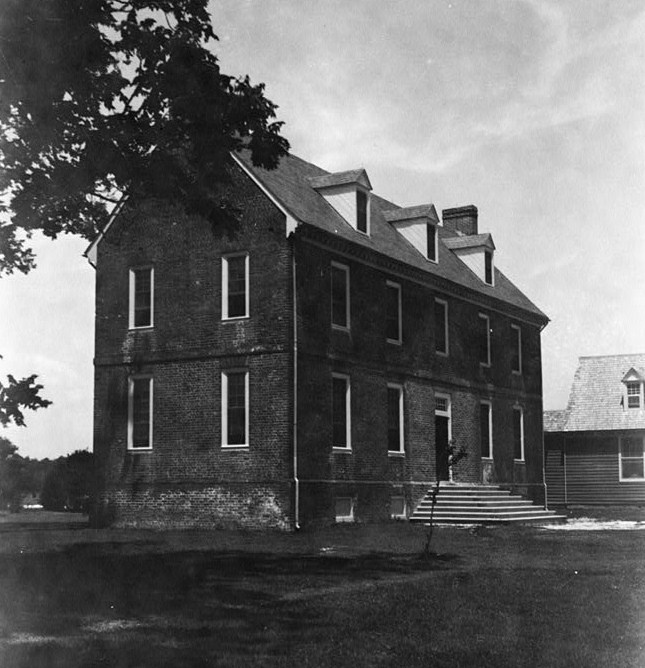
Little England

The historic Little England plantation house is in the area and Bena was home to the Little England Daffodil Farm.
