= Richard Mason (RAF officer) =

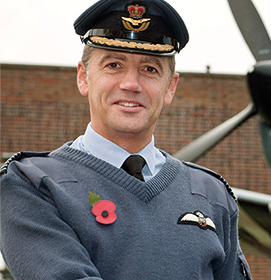
- Group Captain Mason in 2012
- Born: June 1966 (age 60)
- Military career
- Allegiance: United Kingdom
- Branch: Royal Air Force
- Service years: 1985–
- Rank: Air Commodore
- Commands: RAF Benson
- Conflicts: Operation Barras; War in Afghanistan
- Awards: Officer of the Order of the British Empire

Air Commodore Richard David Mason OBE is a Royal Air Force officer.

== RAF career ==
Educated at King Edward's School, Birmingham, Mason was commissioned into the Royal Air Force on 4 July 1985. After taking part in Operation Barras in September 2000 and subsequently in the War in Afghanistan, he became Station Commander at RAF Benson in 2010 and Capability Director at Joint Helicopter Command in 2014.

He was appointed an Officer of the Order of the British Empire in the 2009 New Year Honours.
