= Traveller's Rest (Kearneysville, West Virginia) =

Historic house in West Virginia

- U.S. National Register of Historic Places
- U.S. National Historic Landmark
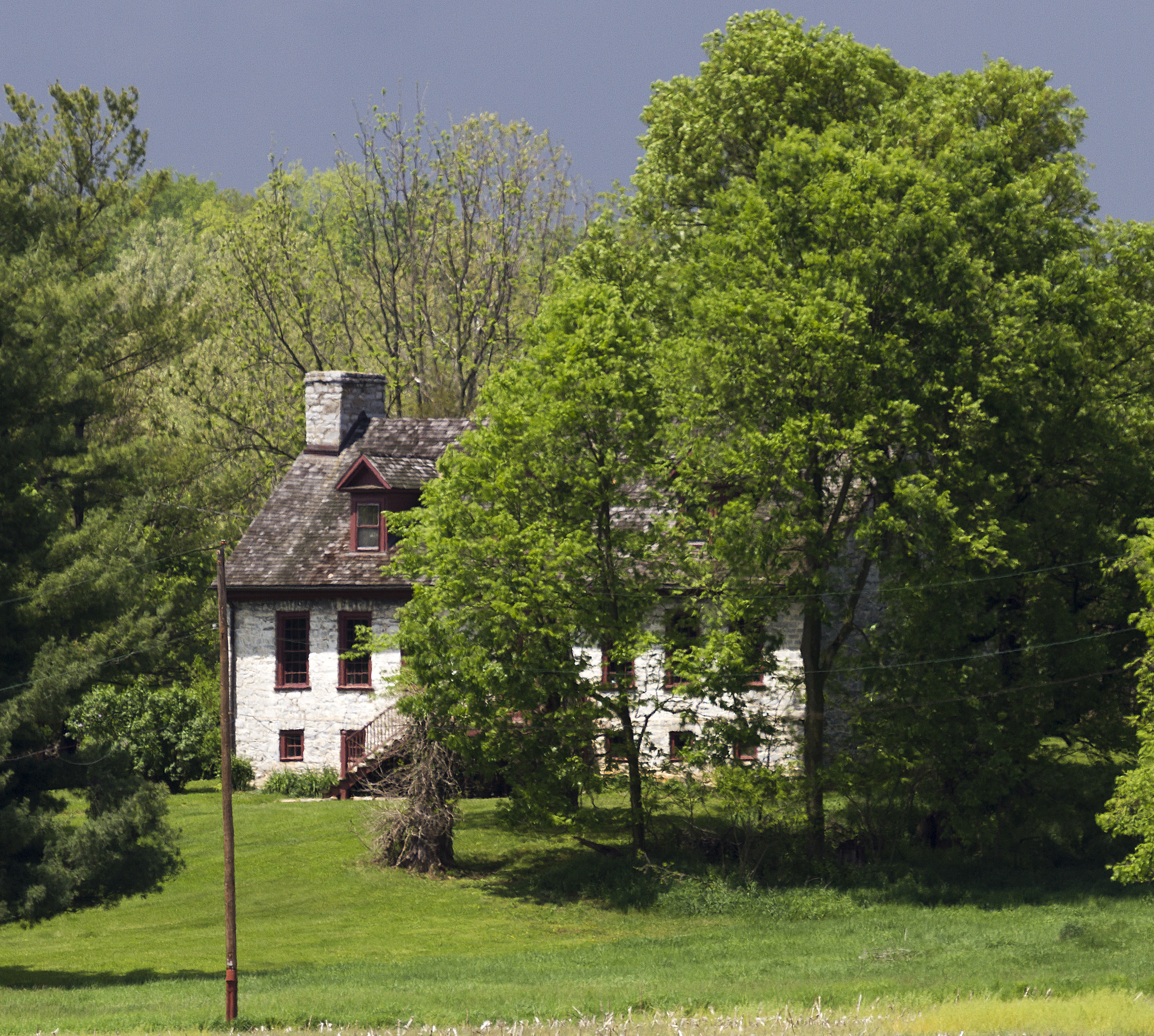
- Traveller's Rest in 2013

- Location within West Virginia Location within the United States
- Location: Bowers Rd., west of Kearneysville, West Virginia
- Coordinates: 39°23′17.3″N 77°54′04.3″W
- Area: 202 acres (82 ha)
- Built: 1773
- Architect: Horatio Gates, John Ariss
- NRHP reference No.: 72001288

Significant dates
- Added to NRHP: November 15, 1972
- Designated NHL: November 15, 1972

Traveller's Rest, also known as the General Horatio Gates Home, is a historic plantation house located on Bowers Road near Kearneysville, West Virginia, built in 1773 and enlarged a few years later. It was the home of Continental Army General Horatio Gates from 1773 until 1790. The house is very little altered from that period, and was designated a National Historic Landmark in 1972. It is located on private property and is not normally open to the public.

== Description ==
Traveller's Rest is located in a rural setting west of Kearneysville, on more than 200 acres (81 ha) of land which Bowers Road (County Road 1/1) runs through in an east–west direction. The main house, a 1 1/2-story stone structure, is set well back on the north side of the road. The eastern section was built by the Hyatt family in a side hall plan, with the western added by Gates a few years later in 1773. The eastern section is a 1 1/2-story structure over a full basement, with a gable roof. It measures about 34 feet wide and 30 feet deep. The western section is also a 1 1/2-story structure with a full basement and measures about 16 feet wide and 30 feet deep. The elevation is seven bays wide.

== History ==
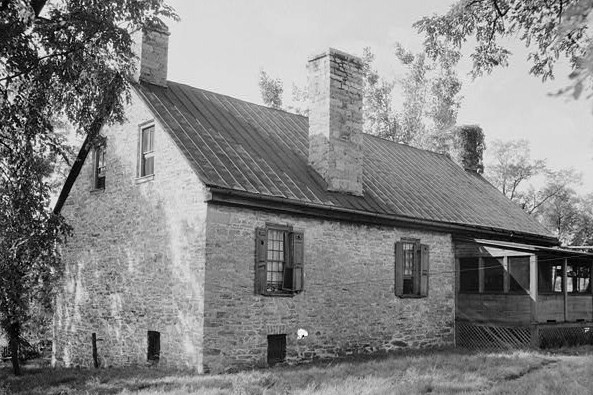
Traveler's Rest, 1936 HABS Photo

Horatio Gates, a native of England, served in the British Army during the French and Indian War, but was prevented from advancement after the war by a lack of money or political connection. Gates and his family sailed from England to Virginia in 1772 and bought 659 acres (267 ha) on the Potomac River near Shepherdstown in what is now West Virginia. He built this limestone house and became a slave owner, a local justice, and a lieutenant colonel in the militia. When the American Revolutionary War broke out, Gates helped organized the Continental Army, and went on to become of its more controversial generals, gaining the important victory at Saratoga in 1777 and a humiliating loss at Camden in 1780. After the war, Gates returned to Traveller's Rest. In 1790, he sold the home, freed his slaves and moved to New York City.

Gates employed John Ariss for interior woodwork, at a time when Ariss was working on nearby projects for the Washington family. Gates added to the original four-bay structure ashlar masonry, appending a three-bay random rubble stone extension. The dormers were added after Gates's tenure.

The only major documented alteration to the house after the period of Gates ownership is the addition of dormers to the gabled roof.

== See also ==
- List of National Historic Landmarks in West Virginia
- National Register of Historic Places listings in Jefferson County, West Virginia
