= Kearneysville, West Virginia =

- Unincorporated community
- South view of Route 115

- Location within West Virginia Location within the United States
- Coordinates: 39°23′17″N 77°53′8″W
- Country: United States
- State: West Virginia
- Counties: Jefferson, Berkeley

Population (2000)
  - Total: 6,716
- Time zone: UTC-5 (Eastern (EST))
  - Summer (DST): UTC-4 (EDT)
- ZIP codes: 25430
- GNIS feature ID: 1541092

Kearneysville is an unincorporated community in Jefferson and Berkeley Counties, in the U.S. state of West Virginia's Eastern Panhandle in the lower Shenandoah Valley. According to the 2000 census, Kearneysville and its surrounding community has a population of 6,716.

Kearneysville is served by the Eastern Panhandle Transit Authority.

== Sites on the National Register of Historic Places ==
Site	Year built	Address	Listed
Elmwood-on-the-Opequon		3898 Sulphur Springs Road	2006
John VanMetre House		177 Elsie Drive	2004
Rellim Farm (Miller Farm)	late 19th century	Leetown Road (CR 1)	1998
Sunnyside Farm (William A. Fulk House)	mid 19th century	Leetown Road (CR 1)	1999
Traveller's Rest (General Horatio Gates House)	circa 1773	WV 480	1972
Woodlawn (Wiltshire House)	19th century	30 Wiltshire Road	2000
