= Richard Mason (historian) =

Richard Henry Pitt Mason (3 March 1934 – 27 June 2009), also known as R.H.P. Mason, was an Australian academic, historian and Japanologist, and professor at the Australian National University in Canberra, before retiring in 1993.

Mason was born and raised in England, following a year of military service, he began studying Japanese history under Carmen Blacker at Cambridge University, which he attended from 1954 to 1958. His PhD dissertation, completed at Australia National University, and published as a book in 1969, was entitled "Japan's First General Election, 1890."

As a scholar, he specialized in Meiji period politics, but maintained a strong interest in classical Japanese poetry as well.

== Selected works ==
In an overview of writings by and about Mason, OCLC/WorldCat lists roughly 10+ works in 50+ publications in 5 languages and 1,900+ library holdings.

This list is not finished; you can help Wikipedia by adding to it.

- A history of Japan, 1972 (with J.G. Caiger)
- Japan's first general election, 1890, 1962
- Saigyō, 1979
- 日本の第一回総選挙, 1973
- 日本の歴史, 1997
- A map guide to Japan, 1968

== Other websites ==
- Mason, R.H.P at Virtual International Authority File (VIAF)
