= Little England (Gloucester, Virginia) =

Historic house in Virginia, United States

- U.S. National Register of Historic Places
- Virginia Landmarks Register
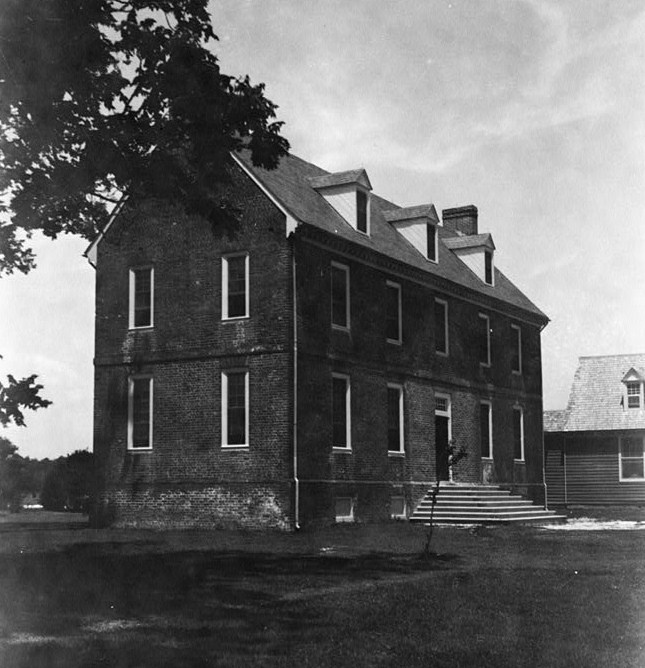
- Little England, HABS Photo

- Location within Virginia Location within the United States
- Location: E of Gloucester on VA 672, near Gloucester, Virginia
- Coordinates: 37°15′09″N 76°28′33″W
- Area: 70 acres (28 ha)
- Built: c. 1775
- Built by: Ariss, John; Willing, Charles
- Architectural style: Georgian
- NRHP reference No.: 70000795
- VLR No.: 036-0030

Significant dates
- Added to NRHP: December 18, 1970
- Designated VLR: October 6, 1970

Little England is a historic plantation house located near Gloucester, Gloucester County, Virginia. The plantation dates to a 1651 land grant to a John Perrin family by Governor William Berkeley. His descendant, also named John Perrin, built the house on a point of land overlooking the York River directly across from Yorktown in 1716 with plans reputed to have been drawn by Christopher Wren. The house was used as a lookout for ships during the Battle of Yorktown. It is a 2 1/2-story, five-bay, gable roofed brick dwelling in the Georgian style. A 1 1/2-story frame wing was added in 1954. It has a single-pile plan and two interior end chimneys. The brickwork is Flemish bond with few glazed headers. Little England is one of Virginia's least altered and best-preserved colonial plantation homes. The interior features some of the finest colonial paneling in Virginia.

The house was restored in 1939.

It was added to the National Register of Historic Places in 1970.

== See also ==
- Bena, Virginia
- Rosewell Plantation
