= Gunston Hall School =

Former private girls school in Washington, D.C.

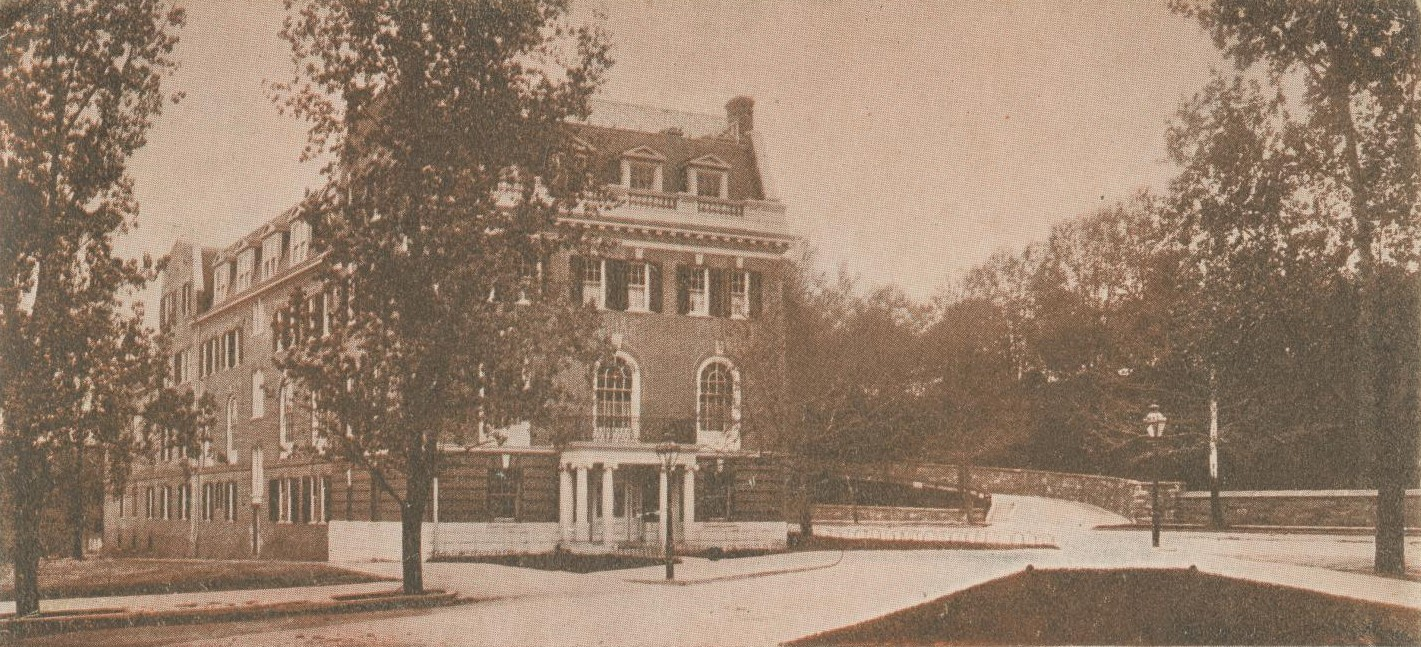
- Postcard of Gunston Hall School, 1913
- 1904 Florida Avenue N.W. Washington, D.C. United States

Information
- Other name: Gunston Hall School for Girls
- Type: Private
- Established: 1892
- Founder: Beverley Randolph Mason and Elizabeth Nelson Mason
- Closed: 1942
- Principal: Richard Nelson Mason

Gunston Hall School was an American private women's finishing school located in Washington, D.C. It was established by Beverley Randolph Mason and his wife in 1892. The school closed in 1942 due to World War II.

== History ==
Beverley Randolph Mason and his wife, Elizabeth Harrison Nelson, started Gunston Hall School for Girls in 1892. They founded the school because they were not satisfied with the educational opportunities for girls in Washington D.C. at the time. It was named for Gunston Hall, the historic house of George Mason, Beverly Mason's great-grandfather.

The purpose of Gunston Hall School was to "train students to be intellectually mature, physically fit, socially well adjusted and to give them a basic faith in God that will steady and support them all their lives". The school's first students were Mason's children and children from their neighborhood. The Masons were jointly the school's principals. Mason previously taught at the United States Military Academy in West Point and was a mathematics teacher and Latin teacher at the Norwood Institute.

Originally, Gunston Hall School was operated from the Mason home at 3017 O Street in the Georgetown neighborhood of Washington, D.C. In 1900, the school moved to Thomas Circle, before moving to 1904 Florida Avenue N.W. in 1906 where it remained until it closed. The latter location had more classroom space and accommodations for boarding students. By 1905, Gunston Hall School had eight resident teachers and twelve visiting teachers. Day students were transported by private conveyance provided by the school.

For the 1911–1912 academic year, the school had fifty students and 27 teachers. Its younger students wore sailor blouses with wool jumpers, black stockings, and black buttoned shoes; the older students wore shirtwaists and silk petticoats. Tuition and board were $750 to $800 for the year, depending on the room. Students had to provide two sets of sheets and twelve dinner napkins for their use. Added fees included $2 to use the tennis courts and $25 to use the piano for daily practice.

Beverly Mason died in April 1910. Josephine Mason, daughter of the school's founders, taught at Gunston Hall School after graduating from college and before her marriage in 1916. Her brother, Richard Nelson Mason, also taught at the school, served as its business manager, and later became its principal until he died in 1940. By 1927, Gunston Hall School was the second oldest private school in Washington, D.C. Its principal was Mary L. Gildersleeve. The school started a new pre-academic program in 1927, providing day school classes for grades kindergarten through eight.

In the 1930s, Gunston Hall ranked "among the highest 'culture school' for girls in the United States". In June 1942, the school's commencement speaker was Harry S. Truman, whose daughter Margaret was graduating. The then senator's speech was part of the school's 50th anniversary celebration. However, Gunston Hall School closed in 1942 because of a shortage of teachers, resulting from World War II.

After the school closed, the recently widowed Josephine Mason Easley moved there; it remained her home until she died in 1962.

=== Reestablishment ===
Easley and her three sisters kept the school's state charter for twenty years. In 1961, the Pohick Church in Lorton, Virginia began efforts to reform Gunston Hall School on its property in Gunston Neck, Virginia. Before she died, Easley was involved in the effort and transferred the school's charter to Pohick Church.

The reestablished Gunston Hall School opened in Virginia in 1962 and taught grades kindergarten through fifth grade. Architect Milton L. Grigg was hired to design a new building for the school. However, the school closed in 1966 after the Pohick Church members showed no interest in the project.

The school's charter was transferred to a private school in Springfield, Virginia that St. Christopher's Episcopal Church operated. In Springfield, the school was coeducational and taught kindergarten through sixth grade. The Springfield school closed in 1978 after losing its lease.

In 1979, Gunston Hall School became a foundation and educational endowment fund, started by Helen and John Wharton Hazard to help needy students with learning disabilities. The Hazards had been involved with reforming Gunston Hall School in Lorton; John was the school's president, and Helen was its principal.

== Campus ==
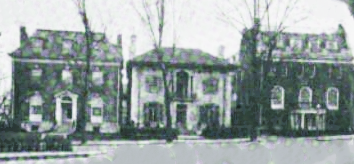
Three building of Gunston Hall School, 1927

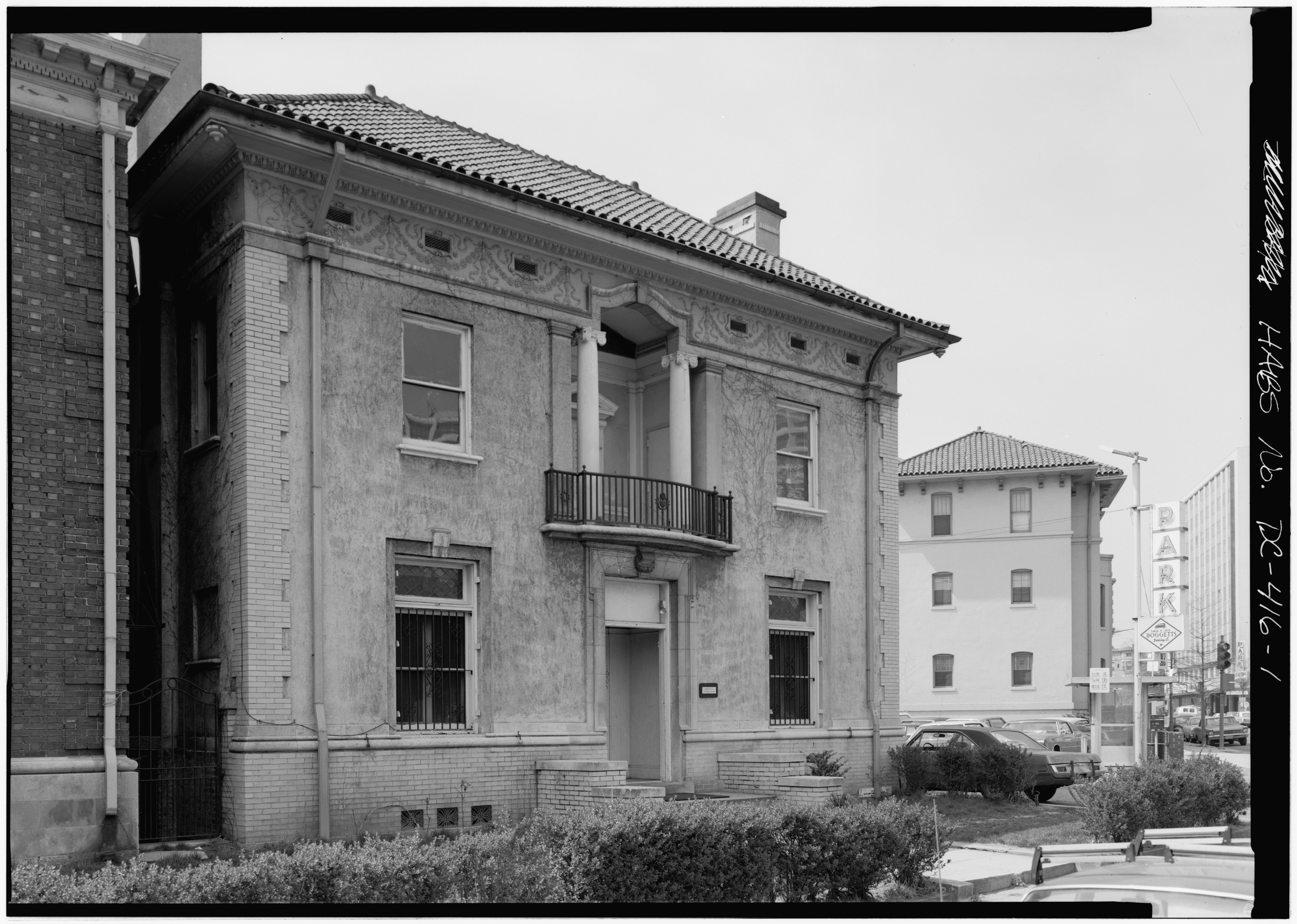
Gunston Hall School, T Street Building, 1933

Originally, the Gunston Hall School was located in a private home at 3017 O Street in the Georgetown neighborhood of Washington, D.C. This large mansion was built in the early 19th century as the home of Commodore Stephen Cassin. The school faced Temple Heights, an 18-acre residential estate.

From 1900 to 1906, the school was located on Thomas Circle at the intersection of Massachusetts Avenue and 14th Street. It included two adjacent houses and a corner apartment building.

In 1906, the school moved to 1904 Florida Avenue N.W. where it remained until it closed. The Florida Avenue campus included a new central building in Colonial revival style, providing more classrooms, a gymnasium, and dormitories for boarding students. The school acquired the building next door at 1904 T Street in 1926; this structure was designed by architect Waddy Butler Wood of Wood, Donn, and Deming in 1907. A third building adjacent building was added in 1927, expanding the campus to more than a city block. The campus included a large yard, with tennis courts. It also had a rooftop garden.

== Academics ==
Guston Hall was a finishing school. In 1906, the school had primary and preparatory departments. In addition to standard classes, courses were taught in French, German, Latin, and Spanish. Music lessons include piano, mandolin, violin, and voice. Students also took classes in physical culture, including basketball, fencing, and tennis.

In 1927, Gunston Hall started day school for grades kindergarten through eight. These students had daily French classes and were taught art, music, and rhythmic dancing. Its boarding school included academic, college preparatory, and collegiate departments. Courses included art, athletics, domestic science, music, and secretarial.

With the start of World War II, the school streamlined its curriculum. Students were encouraged to take typing, shorthand, and home economics. However, art, cooking, literature, and music were still taught. In addition, the school added training in interior design in September 1942.

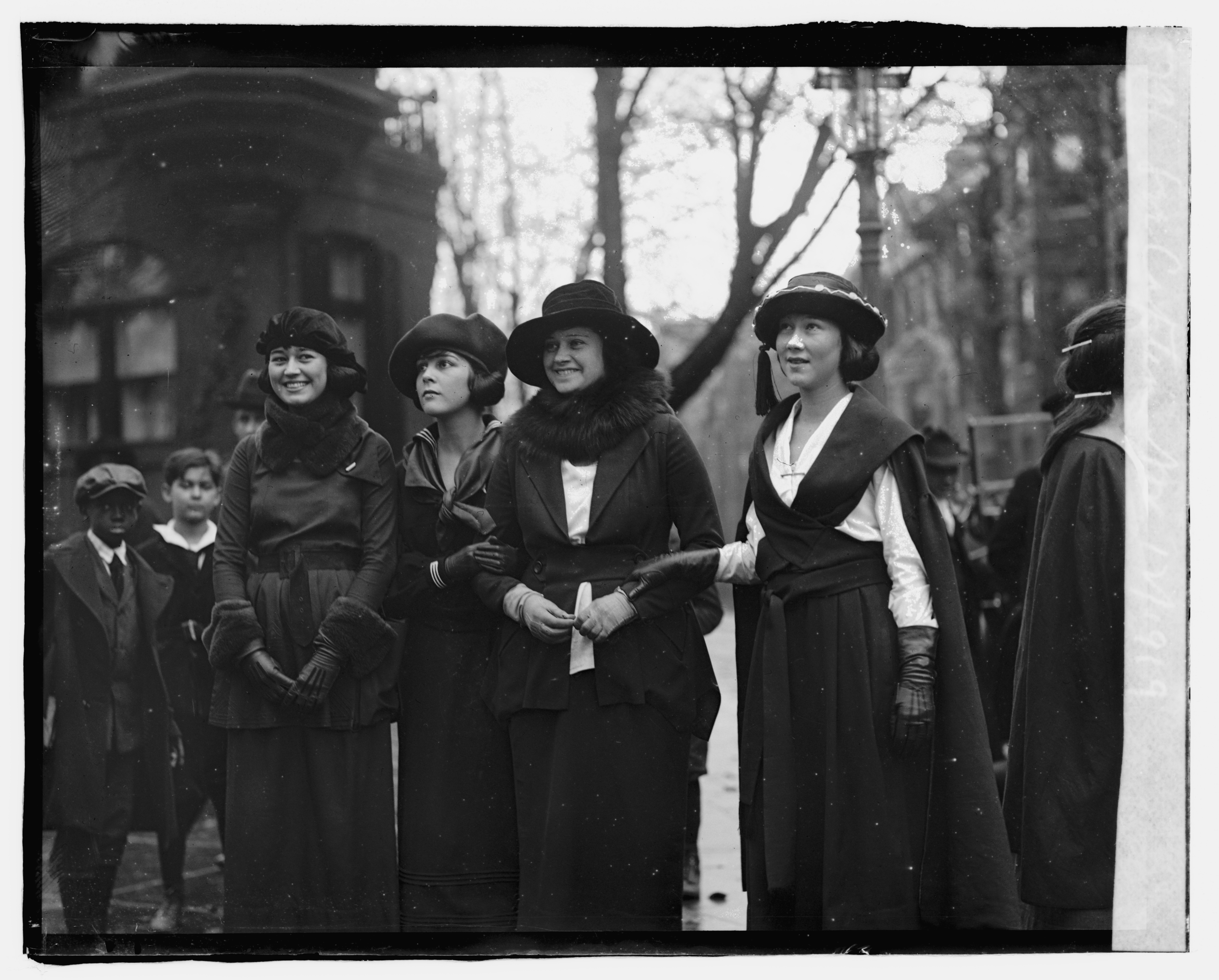
Gunston Hall students awaiting the Prince of Wales departure from the French Embassy, Washington, D.C., 1919

== Student life ==
Gunston Hall School had chapters of the sororities Kappa Delta from 1903 to 1912, Sigma Iota Chi from 1908 to 1911, and Alpha Kappa Psi from 1911 to 1912. (Note: As the sororities became members of the National Panhellenic Conference, they had to drop chapters not established at colleges. Because Gunston Hall School did not provide a college degree, it lost all three sororities.) It also had a Fencing Club. The school held an annual carnival, featuring students in theatrical performances and costumed dances. Student went on field trips, including attending the Army-Navy football game in 1910 and a tour of the Post Office's dead letter mail facility.

== Notable people ==
=== Alumnae ===
- Lillian Somoza de Sevilla Sacasa, daughter of Nicaragua, president Anastasio Somoza García
- Martha Anne Woodrum Zillhardt, aviator
- Margaret Truman, classical soprano, actress, journalist, radio and television personality, writer, and daughter of President Harry S. Truman

=== Faculty ===
- Beverley Randolph Mason, founder and principal
- Richard Nelson Mason, teacher and principal
- Bertha E. Perrie, artist and art instructor
