= Elmwood-on-the-Opequon =

Historic house in West Virginia, United States

- U.S. National Register of Historic Places
- Location within West Virginia Location within the United States
- Nearest city: Kearneysville, West Virginia
- Coordinates: 39°21′13″N 77°57′43″W
- Area: 70 acres (28 ha)
- Built: 1830
- Architectural style: Side-passage
- NRHP reference No.: 06000165
- Added to NRHP: March 22, 2006

Elmwood-on-the-Opequon is a farmstead near Kearneysville, West Virginia. The farm complex exemplifies the evolution of a prosperous West Virginia farmstead through the 19th and 20th centuries. The house has expanded around an original log cabin, gradually expanding with major expansions in the 20th century.

== Description ==
The main house began in 1830 as a log house, evolving through additions to a rambling stuccoed farmhouse. The 1830 log cabin was a 1-story or 1 1/2-story single-pen structure. This was raised to two stories with a two-story wood-frame addition, with the original chimney becoming an interior chimney. In 1906, the house was greatly expanded by a two-story addition, built at a 90-degree angle to the original house, and incorporating an earlier free-standing log kitchen. The addition is five bays wide on the lower level and four bays wide on the upper. The original part of the house has two rooms upstairs and downstairs with a side passage hall. The addition has three rooms downstairs and two upstairs, with a double-run stair. A wide porch is located on the main elevation and the north side.

The property includes a number of outbuildings and dependencies. A barn and a corn crib were built about 1906. The barn's interior is finished with beaded wood. A stuccoed log smokehouse with a pyramidal roof and a stone springhouse date to the 1830s. A small gazebo-like pavilion with a pyramidal roof acts as a wellhouse. An early 20th-century icehouse has been converted to a garage.

Elmwood-on-the-Opequon was listed on the National Register of Historic Places in 2006.
