= Richard Chichester Mason =

Confederate Army officer, physician and planter (1793–1869)

Member of the Virginia House of Delegates from Fairfax County
- In office December 4, 1826 – December 2, 1827 Serving with Nathaniel Tyler
- Preceded by: John Moore
- Succeeded by: James Sangster
- In office November 29, 1824 – December 4, 1825 Serving with Robert T. Thompson
- Preceded by: John Moore
- Succeeded by: John Moore

Personal details
- Born: May 7, 1793 Newington, Fairfax County, Virginia
- Died: July 22, 1869 (aged 76) Rutledge, Fauquier County, Virginia
- Spouse: Lucy Bolling Randolph
- Relations: grandson of George Mason IV
- Children: 16, including Beverley, John, and William
- Parent(s): Thomson Mason; Sarah McCarty Chichester
- Education: University of Pennsylvania
- Occupation: physician, planter, politician, justice of the peace, Confederate States Army officer

Richard Chichester Mason (7 May 1793 – 22 July 1869) was an American planter, medical doctor and politician in Fairfax County, Virginia, which he twice represented in the Virginia House of Delegates. Mason also practiced medicine in Alexandria, Virginia (part of the District of Columbia until 1847) and spent the American Civil War in Richmond working for the Confederate States Army.

== Early life and education ==
Richard Chichester Mason may have been born at Newington plantation in Fairfax County to the former Sarah McCarty Chichester (1770–1826) on May 7, 1793. Descended from the First Families of Virginia, his father was planter Thomson Mason (1759–1820), who with his father's financial assistance constructed a house known as Hollin Hall on his Fairfax County property shortly after this marriage. The marriage produced four sons and four daughters who survived to adulthood (an elder brother George William Mason was born at Hollin Hall in 1791 and would move to Kentucky where he died in 1855). Thomson Mason would serve in both houses of the Virginia General Assembly during his boy's childhood. The eldest brother, Thomson Francis Mason (1785-1838 would become a judge in Washington DC), and the youngest brother, John Mason (1797–1820) died around the same time as their father. Their paternal grandfather, George Mason, was a prominent patriot in the American Revolutionary War, having served in the House of Burgesses and later the Virginia House of Delegates and drafted the Virginia Declaration of Rights. George Mason also served as one of Virginia's representatives to the federal Constitutional Convention in 1783, where he became known in part for his denunciations of slavery and the slave trade, and later became one of the most noted anti-Federalists at the Virginia Ratification Convention of 1788, though he died months before this boy's birth. His maternal grandfather, Richard Chichester (1736–1796), for whom the boy was named, was also a planter and local government official.

R.C. Mason received a private education appropriate to his class, then traveled to Philadelphia to attend the University of Pennsylvania School of Medicine. He graduated as a Doctor of Medicine in 1816. Mason's doctoral thesis was on menstruation.

== Career ==
Shortly before this boy's birth, his father Thomson Mason inherited a portion of the Gunston Hall estate, which his father George Mason and previous generations of the family had farmed using enslaved labor. George Mason had died on October 7, 1792, after training his three eldest sons including Thomson Mason (who shared the name with his lawyer uncle, who died before his brother) to operate using enslaved labor even before they reached reaching legal age to hold property. However, in his final years, the elder Mason trained his two youngest sons, John Mason and Thomas Mason to become merchants, but they too became wealthy planters after the Fairfax County court admitted a 1775 will into probate when this man was a boy.

Around 1817, as R.C. Mason reached legal age, Thomson Mason divided his Fairfax County property into two plantations: Dogue Run farm for this man and Hunting Creek farm for his brother Thomson Francis Mason (1785–1838). Upon returning to Virginia, Dr. Robert C. Mason advertised his new medical practice in Alexandria, with his office on King Street and home on St. Asaph Streets (in what is now known as Old Town Alexandria). By 1819, R.C. Mason and his family also owned property in the southern section of Alexandria known as Round Hill.

During the 1820s, Fairfax County voters twice elected (but failed to re-elect) Dr. R.C. Mason as one of their delegates in the Virginia House of Delegates (a part-time position). He served one term alongside his distant lawyer cousin Robert Townshend Thompson and one term alongside Nathaniel Tyler. While practicing medicine in Alexandria (before retiring at age 45), Mason also served as a justice of the peace in Fairfax County. His brother Thomson F. Mason served on the Alexandria City council in the 1820s and 1830s, and as the town's mayor 1828–1830. In 1824, Hollin Hall burned down and was not immediately rebuilt. During the 1830s R.C. Mason began building a new manor house on his Dogue Run plantation, where he began living by 1834 and called Okeley Manor.

When R.C. Mason retired from his Alexandria medical practice and lived at Okeley Manor, which was in Fairfax County even before Alexandria's retrocession to Virginia in 1847, he operated his plantation using enslaved labor. In the 1850 Federal Census, Mason characterized himself as a "farmer", and lived with wife and their four youngest children. In that year, he owned 17 slaves in Fairfax County, ranging from a 48 year old Black man and his 45 year old mulatto wife to 7 year old black and 6 year old mulatto boys and 6 and 4 year old mulatto girls. A decade later, the census district was renamed for the Orange and Alexandria Railroad which ran through it, and R.C. Mason owned ten slaves, the oldest a 31-year-old woman.

Shortly after Virginia voted to secede from the Union at the beginning of the American Civil War, Union troops occupied Alexandria and commandeered Mason's house because of its proximity to the strategically important railroad which connected the town to the state capitol at Richmond. Dr. Mason moved his family to Richmond, but alternate stories exist as to his wartime activities. His pardon application in 1865 said he was a writer in General Cooper's office. However a record exists of his 1861 enlistment in the Confederate States Army, and on October 1, 1861, Sergeant R.C. Mason was assigned as a medic at Culpeper Court House. Moreover, his sons Beverly Randolph Mason and Thomas Pinckney Mason served as Confederate officers (army and naval respectively) during the conflict.

Following the conflict, R.C. Mason returned home at age 72 to find the mansion at Okeley had been used during the war as a hospital (particularly for infectious smallpox patients), then burned to the ground. A negro and an Irishman seemed to possess the property. On September 20, 1865, Mason having signed the required oath of loyalty to the United States, President Andrew Johnson pardoned Mason for his activities on behalf of the confederacy.

== Death and legacy ==
R.C. Mason died on 22 July 1869 at "Rutledge" in Fauquier County, Virginia at age 76. By 1880, Mason's son Beverley Mason had recovered the Dogue Run property and lived at a house he built on the hill. The property is now a Fairfax County park and nature preserve known as Huntley Meadows Park.

== Marriage, children and descendants ==
Mason married Lucy Bolling Randolph, also of the First Families of Virginia through her father Colonel Robert Randolph, on 14 May 1816 at "Eastern View" plantation in Fauquier County, Virginia. Lucy would bear sixteen children including:

- Robert Thomson Mason (12 May 1818–1890)
- William Fitzhugh Mason (4 April 1821–12 July 1822)
- Randolph Fitzhugh Mason (1 March 1823–9 August 1862)
- Lucius Meade Mason (24 May 1824–6 January 1845)
- Eliza Carter Mason (24 May 1824–12 December 1832)
- Baynton Turner Mason (8 January 1826–27 June 1857)
- Richard Randolph Mason (19 April 1827–18 March 1886)
- Lucy Bolling Mason (8 September 1831–15 December 1832)
- Eliza Lucy Mason (13 December 1832–8 July 1862)
- Beverley Randolph Mason (1 September 1834–22 April 1910)
- Eva Mary Anna Mason Heth (17 January 1836–19 November 1915)
- John Stevens Mason (18 August 1839–3 April 1918)
- Landon Randolph Mason (31 December 1841–21 June 1923)
- William Pinckney Mason (10 January 1843–16 December 1923)

Richard Chichester Mason was a grandson of George Mason (1725–1792); nephew of George Mason V (1753–1796); grandnephew of Thomson Mason (1733–1785); son of Thomson Mason (1759–1820) and Sarah McCarty Chichester Mason; first cousin once removed of Stevens Thomson Mason (1760–1803) and John Thomson Mason (1765–1824); second cousin of Armistead Thomson Mason (1787–1819), John Thomson Mason (1787–1850), and John Thomson Mason, Jr. (1815–1873); first cousin of George Mason VI (1786–1834), Richard Barnes Mason (1797–1850), and James Murray Mason (1798–1871); second cousin once removed of Stevens Thomson Mason (1811–1843); and first cousin thrice removed of Charles O'Conor Goolrick.

Ancestors of Richard Chichester Mason

16. George Mason II
8. George Mason III
17. Mary Fowke
4. George Mason IV
18. Stevens Thomson
9. Ann Stevens Thomson
19. Dorothea Taunton
2. Thomson Mason
20. William Eilbeck
10. William Eilbeck
21. Margaret Dixon
5. Ann Eilbeck
22. John Edgar
11. Sarah Edgar
23. Johanna
1. Richard Chichester Mason
24. John Chichester
12. Richard Chichester
25. Elizabeth Symes
6. Richard Chichester
26. William Ball III
13. Ellen Ball
27. Hannah Heale
3. Sarah McCarty Chichester
28. Dennis McCarty
14. Daniel McCarty
29. Sarah Ball
7. Sarah McCarty
30. James Ball
15. Sinah Ball
31. Mary Conway
