= Thomson Mason (1759–1820) =

American politician (1759–1820)

Member of the Virginia House of Delegates from Fairfax County
- In office December 5, 1808 – December 3, 1809 Serving with George Graham
- Preceded by: George Summers
- Succeeded by: James H. Hooe

Member of the Virginia Senate from Fairfax and Prince William Counties
- In office December 1, 1800 – December 4, 1808
- Preceded by: Ludwell Lee
- Succeeded by: John C. Hunter

Personal details
- Born: March 4, 1759 Gunston Hall, Fairfax County, Colony of Virginia
- Died: March 11, 1820 (aged 61) Fairfax County, Virginia
- Spouse: Sarah McCarty Chichester
- Children: Mary Thomson Mason Ball; Thomson Francis Mason; Ann Eilbeck Mason Dawson; Elizabeth Thomson Mason; George William Mason; Sarah Chichester Mason; Richard Chichester Mason; John Mason
- Parent(s): George Mason IV; Ann Eilbeck
- Occupation: entrepreneur, planter, civil servant, justice

Thomson Mason (4 March 1759 – 11 March 1820) was an American planter, soldier and politician who represented Fairfax County in both chambers of the Virginia General Assembly. He was one of the sons of George Mason, an American patriot, statesman, and delegate from Virginia to the U.S. Constitutional Convention.

== Early life and education ==
Mason was born on 4 March 1759 at Gunston Hall in Fairfax County, Virginia. Mason was the fifth child and fourth eldest son of George Mason and his wife Ann Eilbeck, who died when he was an infant. He shared the same name as his uncle Thomson Mason, his father's younger brother who became a prominent lawyer, politician and judge until his death in 1785, and also owned and operated plantations using enslaved labor, mostly in Loudoun County. Meanwhile, as appropriate to their class, tutors at Gunston Hall educated Thomson Mason and his brother John Mason and cousin John Thomson Mason.

In 1781, Mason served as a militiaman in the American Revolutionary War.

== Marriage and children ==
Mason married Sarah McCarty Chichester of Newington in 1784. The couple had eight children:

- Mary Thomson Mason Ball (died April 1837)
- Thomson Francis Mason (1785–21 December 1838)
- Ann Eilbeck Mason Dawson (1787–1845)
- Elizabeth Thomson Mason (1789–2 September 1821)
- George William Mason (4 May 1791–11 June 1855)
- Sarah Chichester Mason (1792–1820)
- Richard Chichester Mason (7 May 1793–22 July 1869)
- John Mason (1797–26 October 1820)

== Planter ==
Through deeds of gift in 1781 and 1786, Mason's father passed to him ownership of four tracts totaling 676 acres (2.74 km^{2}), together with slaves. While his brother George was in Europe trying to recover his health, Thomson operated his plantations, thus gaining experience using enslaved labor. In 1787, this Thomson Mason owned eight enslaved adults and 14 enslaved children near his father's main residence at Gunston Hall, and an additional two enslaved adults and three children in the other Fairfax County district near his brother George's residence.

Mason and his wife Sarah constructed their residence Hollin Hall by 1788. However, fire destroyed that building in 1824, after this man's death. In 1916, industrialist Harley Wilson built an elegant new Hollin Hall in its vicinity.

== Political career ==
Thomson Mason represented Fairfax County in both houses of the Virginia General Assembly. Voters in Fairfax and neighboring Prince William County elected him to the Virginia Senate in 1800 and re-elected him to another four year term, and he ended his legislative career in the Virginia House of Delegates with a single term in 1808.

== Later life ==
Mason died on 11 March 1820 in Fairfax County, Virginia at age 61.

== Relations ==
Thomson Mason (1759–1820) was:

- a son of George Mason (1725–1792)
- father of Thomson Francis Mason (1785–1838)
- nephew of Thomson Mason (1733–1785)
- first cousin of Stevens Thomson Mason (1760–1803), John Thomson Mason (1765–1824), and William Temple Thomson Mason (1782–1862)
- uncle of George Mason VI (1786–1834) and Richard Barnes Mason (1797–1850), and James Murray Mason (1798–1871)
- first cousin once removed of Armistead Thomson Mason (1787–1819), John Thomson Mason (1787–1850), and John Thomson Mason, Jr. (1815–1873), and
- first cousin twice removed of Stevens Thomson Mason (1811–1843).
