= Porter (surname) =

Porter or O'Porter is a surname, and may refer to:

== A ==
- Aaron Porter (born 1985), British student affairs and higher education activist
- Adam Porter (born 2002), English footballer
- Adina Porter, American actress
- Adriana Porter (1857–1946), Canadian poet and alleged witch
- Agnes Porter (c.1752–1814), Scottish diarist
- Al Porter (born 1993), Irish comedian, actor and writer
- Alan Porter (born 1977), American baseball umpire
- Alana Porter (born 2001), Australian rules footballer
- Albert Porter (cricketer) (1864–1937), English cleric and cricketer
- Albert G. Porter (1824–1897), American politician from Indiana
- Albert S. Porter (1904–1979), American engineer and politician from Ohio
- Alex Porter (born 1980), English volleyball player
- Alexander Porter (1785–1844), American lawyer, planter and politician from Louisiana
- Alexander Porter (cyclist) (born 1996), Australian racing cyclist
- Alice Hobbins Porter (1854–1926), British-American journalist and syndicalist
- Alisan Porter (born 1981), American singer, actress and dancer
- Allan Porter (1934–2022), American-Swiss photographer and journalist
- Alvin Porter (born 1977), American football player
- Amy Porter (flutist), American flutist and pedagogue
- Andrew Porter (baseball) (1910–2010), American baseball player
- Andrew Porter (Civil War general) (1820–1872), Union Army general in the American Civil War
- Andrew Porter (historian) (born 1945), British historian
- Andrew Porter (music critic) (1928–2015), British music critic, opera director and organist
- Andrew Porter (Revolutionary War officer) (1743–1813), American officer in the Revolutionary War
- Andrew Porter (rugby union) (born 1996), Irish rugby union footballer
- Andrew C. Porter (born 1942), American educational psychologist and psychometrician
- Andrew I. Porter (born 1946), American science fiction editor and publisher
- Andrew J. Porter (born 1972), American short story writer and novelist
- Sir Andrew Porter, 1st Baronet (1837–1919), Irish lawyer and judge
- Andrew Horsbrugh-Porter (1907–1986), British Army officer and baronet
- Andy Porter (footballer, born 1937), Scottish footballer
- Andy Porter (footballer, born 1968), English footballer, coach and manager
- Anna Porter, Canadian publisher and novelist
- Anna Maria Porter (1778–1832), English poet and novelist
- Anthony Porter (1954–2021), American murderer
- Archie W. N. Porter (1885–1963), American Episcopal bishop
- Art Porter Sr. (1934–1993), American jazz pianist
- Art Porter Jr. (1961–1996), American jazz saxophonist, son of Art Porter Sr.
- Arthur Porter (cricketer) (1914–1994), English cricketer
- Arthur Porter (engineer) (1910–2010), British-Canadian engineer and computer pioneer
- Arthur Porter (historian) (1924–2019), Creole professor and author
- Arthur Porter (MP) (c.1505–1559), English politician
- Arthur Porter (physician) (1956–2015), Canadian physician and hospital administrator
- Arthur Kingsley Porter (1883–1933), American archaeologist, art historian and medievalist
- Arthur Gould-Porter (1905–1987), English actor
- Aubrey Porter (c.1660–1717), English Member of Parliament
- Augustus Porter (1769–1849), American businessman, judge, farmer and politician from New York State
- Augustus Seymour Porter (1798–1872), American politician from Michigan, son of Augustus Porter
- Austin Porter (born 1997), American singer from boy band PrettyMuch

== B ==
- Barry Porter (1939–1996), British lawyer and politician
- Basil Porter (1916–1997), Australian rugby union footballer
- Benjamin Curtis Porter (1843–1908), American artist
- Benjamin F. Porter (1808–1868), American lawyer, reformer and state legislator in Alabama
- Bern Porter (1911–2004), American artist
- Bernard Porter (born 1941), British historian and academic
- Bernadette Porter (born 1952), British Catholic nun and educator
- Bertha Porter (1852–1941), English biographer and bibliographer
- Beth Porter (1942–2023), American actress and writer who worked in the United Kingdom
- Beulah Wright Porter (1869–1928), American physician and educator
- Bill Porter (author) (born 1943), American author who writes under the name Red Pine
- Bill Porter (golfer) (born 1959), American golfer
- Bill Porter (hurdler) (1926–2000), American track and field hurdler
- Bill Porter (salesman) (1932–2013), American salesman with cerebral palsy
- Bill Porter (sound engineer) (1931–2010), American audio engineer and record producer
- Billie JD Porter (born 1992), British journalist, model and documentary filmmaker
- Billy Porter (born 1969), American actor and singer
- Billy Porter (Australian footballer) (1875–1910), Australian rules footballer
- Billy Porter (criminal) (1850–?), American burglar and underworld figure in New York City
- Billy Porter (footballer, born 1905) (1905–1946), English footballer
- Bo Porter (born 1972), American baseball player, manager and coach
- Bob Porter (baseball) (born 1959), American baseball player
- Bob Porter (footballer) (born 1942), Australian rules footballer
- Bob Porter (record producer) (1940–2021), American blues record producer and radio presenter
- Brad Porter (born 1987), Australian soccer player
- Brett Porter (1913–1970), Australian television producer, writer and director
- Brian Porter (cricketer), Australian cricketer
- Brian J. Porter (born 1958), Canadian banker
- Brian S. Porter (born 1938), American politician and police chief from Alaska
- Brittany Martin Porter, American television producer
- Brock Porter (born 2003), American baseball pitcher
- Bruce Porter (1865–1953), American artist and writer
- Bruce D. Porter (1952–2016), American political scientist, academic and LDS Church general authority
- Bruce Bruce-Porter (1869–1948), British physician and writer
- B. J. Porter (born 1970), American actor, writer and comedian

== C ==
- Caleb Porter (born 1975), American soccer coach
- Callum Porter (born 1999), Australian rules footballer
- Cameron Porter (born 1993), American soccer player
- Carol Porter, American candidate from Georgia, wife of DuBose Porter
- Carol Shea-Porter (born 1952), American politician
- Cassie Porter (born 2002), Australian golfer
- Catherine Porter (born 1965), American singer, songwriter and musician
- Chana Porter, American playwright, novelist, and education activist
- Chanice Porter (born 1994), Jamaican long jumper
- Charles Porter (Australian politician) (1910–2004), Australian politician, author, playwright and broadcaster
- Charles Porter (Lord Chancellor of Ireland) (c. 1630–1696), English-born politician and judge
- Charles Porter (Pennsylvania politician) (1756–1830), American politician, Speaker of the Pennsylvania House of Representatives
- Charles Ethan Porter (c.1847–1923), American painter
- C. Fred Porter (Charles Frederick Porter) (1883–1971), American official in Iowa
- Charles Talbot Porter (1826–1910), American lawyer, engineer and inventor
- Charles H. Porter (mayor) (1843–1911), American businessman and politician from Massachusetts
- Charles H. Porter (Virginia politician) (1833–1897), American politician from Virginia
- Charles O. Porter (1919–2006), American lawyer and politician from Oregon
- Charles Ethan Porter (1848–1923), American still life painter
- Charles W. Porter (1849–1891), Secretary of State of Vermont
- Charles Talbot Porter (1826–1910), American lawyer, engineer and inventor
- Charlie Porter (mountaineer) (1950–2014), American mountaineer and climate change scientist
- Charlie Porter (journalist) (born 1973), British fashion journalist
- Charlie Porter (trumpeter) (born 1978), American trumpeter and composer
- Chilla Porter (Charles Michael Porter, 1936–2020), 1956 Australian Olympic silver medalist in high jump
- Christian Porter (Charles Christian Porter, born 1970), member of the Australian Parliament for Pearce
- Charlotte Porter (1857–1942), American poet, translator and literary critic
- Charmaine Porter (born 1995), British racing cyclist
- Chester Porter (1926–2021), Australian barrister
- Chester W. Porter (1861–1911), American farmer and politician from New York
- Chilla Porter (1936–2020), Australian high jumper and political figure
- Chris Porter (basketball) (born 1978), American basketball player
- Natalie Porter (historian), Canadian librarian, skateboarder, author and historian
- Chris Porter (comedian) (born 1979), American comedian
- Chris Porter (footballer, born 1885) (1885–1915), English footballer
- Chris Porter (footballer, born 1979), English football goalkeeper and coach
- Chris Porter (footballer, born 1983), English footballer for Oldham Athletic
- Chris Porter (ice hockey) (born 1984), Canadian ice hockey player
- Chris Porter (producer) (active from 1976), British record producer, engineer and narrator
- Christopher Porter (born 1970), Canadian political activist and dolphin merchant
- Christopher Porter (architect) (c.1801–1874), Australian architect
- Christian Porter (born 1970), Australian politician
- Chrystabel Leighton-Porter (1913–2000), English model
- Chuck Porter (baseball) (born 1955), American baseball pitcher
- Chuck Porter (executive) (born 1945), American advertising executive and author
- Chuck Porter (politician), Canadian politician
- Claire Porter (born 1942), American choreographer/comedian
- Claude R. Porter (1872–1946), American lawyer and politician
- Cliff Porter (1899–1976), New Zealand rugby union footballer
- Cloyd A. Porter (born 1935), American politician
- Cody Porter (born 1997), Canadian ice hockey goaltender
- Cole Porter (1891–1964), American composer
- Colin Porter (born 1975), American baseball player
- Colin Porter (rower) (1930–2020), British rower
- Connie Porter (born 1959), American writer of young-adult books
- Countee Leroy Porter (1903–1946), American writer as Countee Cullen
- Craig Porter Jr. (born 2000), American basketball player
- Curt Porter (born 1988), American football player
- Curtis Porter known as Shafi Hadi (1929–1976), American jazz saxophonist
- Cyril Porter (1890–1964), British track and field athlete
- Cyrus Kinne Porter (1828–1910), American architect

== D ==
- Dameon Porter (born 1975), American football player
- Dan Porter (1931–2017), American baseball player
- Dana Porter (1901–1967), Canadian politician and jurist
- Daniel Porter (born 1992), known professionally as Daniel Portman, Scottish actor
- Daniel Porter (pirate), 18th-century Caribbean pirate and trader
- Daniel J. Porter (born 1966), American businessman
- D. P. Porter (Daniel Price Porter) (1835–1899), Mississippi lawyer and politician
- Darien Porter (born 2001), American football player
- Darrell Porter (1952–2002), American baseball player
- Darren Porter (born 1972), Australian rugby league footballer
- Darwin Porter (born 1937), American travel writer
- Daryl Porter (born 1974), American football player
- Daryl Porter Jr. (born 1990), American attorney and politician
- Daryl Porter Jr. (American football) (born 2002), American football player
- Dave Porter (Canadian politician) (born 1953), Canadian politician
- Dave Porter (composer), American composer
- Dave Porter (Norfolk Islander politician) (born 1954), leader of the Norfolk Liberals
- Dave Porter (sportsman) (1946–2012), American college wrestler and football player
- David Porter (Australian judge), justice of the Supreme Court of Tasmania
- David Porter (bishop) (1906–1993), bishop of Aston in the Church of England
- David Porter (British politician) (born 1948), Member of Parliament for Waveney
- David Porter (Ontario politician) (1849–1893), Ontario businessman and political figure
- David Porter (figure skater) (born 1949), Canadian ice dancing champion
- David Porter (Illinois politician), American politician of the 19th century
- David Porter (musician) (born 1941), American musician
- David Porter (naval officer) (1780–1843), United States Navy officer and ambassador
- David Porter (sport shooter) (born 1953), Australian sport shooter
- David Dixon Porter (1813–1891), American Civil War Navy officer, son of David Porter, naval officer
- David Dixon Porter (Medal of Honor) (1877–1944), American Marine officer of the Philippine–American War
- David Richard Porter (1882–1973), American figure in YMCA
- David Stewart Porter (1909–1989), American judge
- David H. Porter (1935–2016), American academic and college head
- David J. Porter (judge) (born 1966), United States circuit judge
- David J. Porter (politician) (born 1956), American member of the Texas Railroad Commission
- David R. Porter (1788–1867), Pennsylvania politician
- David Dineen-Porter (born 1979), Canadian actor, comedian and musician
- Davina Porter, British audiobook narrator and actor
- Dawn Porter (filmmaker), American documentary film director and producer
- Dawn C. Porter, American business academic
- Dawn O'Porter (born 1979), British television presenter and writer
- DeForest Porter (1840–1889), American jurist and politician
- Deborah Porter (born 1958), American non-profit director
- Del Porter (1902–1977), American jazz vocalist, saxophonist and clarinetist
- Delia Lyman Porter (1858–1933), American author and social reformer
- Denaun Porter (born 1978), American rapper under stage names and record producer
- Derek Porter (born 1967), Northern Irish-Canadian rower
- Derek Porter (footballer) (1936–2023), English football player and manager
- Dick Porter (1901–1974), American baseball player
- Don Porter (1912–1997), American actor
- Donald J. Porter (1921–2003), American judge
- Donn F. Porter (1931–1952), American soldier of the Korean War, posthumous recipient of the Medal of Honor
- Doreen Porter (born 1941), New Zealand sprinter
- Dorothy Porter (1954–2008), Australian poet, daughter of Chester Porter
- Dorothy B. Porter (1905–1995), American librarian
- Dorothy Germain Porter (1924–2012), American golfer
- Doug Porter (1929–2024), American football coach and college athletics administrator
- Doug Porter (politician) (1916–1989), Australian politician
- DuBose Porter (born 1953), American attorney, politician and newspaper publisher
- Drew Porter (born 1985), Australian cricketer
- Dwight J. Porter (1916–2006), American diplomat

== E ==
- Ebenezer Porter (1772–1834), American minister and writer
- Ebenezer F. Porter (1859–1919), American businessman and politician from Kansas
- Edward Porter (cricketer) (1846–1918), English cricketer
- Edward Porter (Labour politician) (1880–1960), British politician and socialite
- Edward F. Porter (1858–1915), American politician
- Edward Griffin Porter (1837–1900), American minister and writer
- Edward Guss Porter (1859–1929), Canadian politician
- Edward S. Porter (1848–1902), American physician in Kentucky
- E. Melvin Porter (Edward Melvin Porter) (1930–2016), American lawyer, politician and civil rights activist
- Edwin S. Porter (1870–1941), American filmmaker
- Eleanor H. Porter (1868–1920), American novelist
- Elias Porter (1914–1987), American psychologist
- Eliot Porter (1901–1990), American photographer
- Eliza Chappell Porter (1807–1888), American educator
- Elizabeth Porter (died 1752), English wife of Samuel Johnson the author
- Elizabeth W. Porter (born 1964), American politician
- Elliott Porter (born 1991), British racing cyclist
- Endymion Porter (1587–1649), English royalist diplomat
- Enid Porter (1908–1984), English curator and collector of folklore
- Eric Porter (1928–1995), English actor
- Eric Porter (filmmaker) (1911–1983), Australian filmmaker and animator
- Erin Porter (born 1990), Canadian curler
- Erin Porter (speed skater) (born 1978), American short track speed skater
- Esther Porter (1900–1935), Ukrainian-Argentine anarchist
- Eugene H. Porter (1856–1929), American physician
- Evan Porter (born 1987), American baseball player and coach
- Ewan Porter (born 1982), Australian golfer

== F ==
- Fairfield Porter (1907–1975), American painter and art critic
- Fannie Porter (born 1873), American madam
- Fitz John Porter (1822–1901), Union Army general in the American Civil War
- Florence Collins Porter (1853–1930), American newspaper editor and temperance advocate
- Foster B. Porter (1891–1965), American politician from Wisconsin
- Frances Porter (1925–2022), New Zealand writer and historian
- Francis Porter (fl. c. 1650–1702), Irish Franciscan
- Frank Porter (cricketer), South African cricketer
- Frank Addison Porter (born 1859), American pianist and composer
- Frank B. Porter, pioneer businessman and real estate developer of Monterey Peninsula
- Frank M. Porter, Trinidadian author
- Fred L. Porter (1877–1938), American politician
- Freda Porter (born 1957), American applied mathematician and environmental scientist
- Frederic Hutchinson Porter (1890–1976), American architect
- Frederick Charles Porter (1832–1869), Australian miner and explorer
- F. W. Porter (Frederick William Porter) (1821–1901), Anglo-Irish architect

== G ==
- Gail Porter (born 1971), British television presenter
- Galen Porter (1807–1883), American police captain
- Gareth Porter (born 1942, American historian, investigative journalist and author
- Garnet Porter (1866–1945), American journalist in Canada
- Garth Porter (born 1948), Australian musician
- Gary Porter (American football), American football quarterback
- Gary Porter (driver) (born 1961), American monster-truck racer
- Gary Porter (footballer) (born 1966), English footballer
- Gary Porter (rugby union) (born 1996), South African rugby union footballer
- Gary Porter, Baron Porter of Spalding (born 1960), British politician
- Gene Porter (1910–1993), American jazz saxophonist and clarinettist
- Gene Stratton-Porter (1863–1924), American writer, nature photographer and naturalist
- George Porter (1920–2002), British chemist
- George Porter Jr. (born 1947), American musician
- George Porter (architect) (c.1796–1856), British architect
- George Porter (British politician) (1884–1973), British politician
- George Porter (conspirator) (1659–1728), English soldier and conspirator
- George Porter (cricketer) (1861–1908), English cricketer
- George Porter (footballer) (born 1992), English professional footballer
- George Porter (hurdler) (born 1966), American athlete
- George Porter (mariner) (1786–1872), British mariner and early settler of South Australia
- George Porter (New Zealand politician) (1921–1998), New Zealand architect, company director and politician
- George Porter (Royalist) (bapt.1621–1683), English army officer of the English Civil War
- George Porter (rugby union) (born 1989), English rugby union footballer
- George Bryan Porter (1791–1834), American politician
- George Hornidge Porter (1822–1895), Irish surgeon
- George Richardson Porter (1792–1852), British statistician
- George E. Porter (active 1965–1980), American sound engineer
- George Porter, usual name of George de Hochepied, 6th Baron de Hochepied (1760–1828), British politician
- Gilchrist Porter (1817–1894), American politician and jurist from Missouri
- Gillian Porter (born 1965), Northern Irish television presenter
- Gladys Porter (1894–1967), Canadian politician
- Graeme Porter (born 1955), Australian cricketer
- Greg Porter, American politician
- Greg Porter (game designer), American designer of role-playing games
- Gregory Porter (born 1971), American jazz vocalist
- Gwendoline Porter (1902–1993), British sprinter
- Guy Porter (athlete) (1884–1951), American track and field athlete
- Guy Porter (rugby union) (born 1997), English rugby union footballer
- Guyan Porter (born 1971), Scottish visual artist

== H ==
- Hal Porter (1911–1984), Australian novelist, playwright, poet and author
- Hannah Porter (born 1979), New Zealand rugby union footballer
- Harold Everett Porter (1887–1936), American writer
- Harry Porter (1882–1965), American high jumper
- H. Boone Porter Jr. (Harry Boone Porter Jr.) (1923–1999), American Episcopal priest and liturgist
- Helen Porter (1899–1987), British botanist
- Helen Fogwill Porter (1930–2023), Canadian writer, educator and activist
- Helen Tracy Lowe-Porter (1876–1963), American translator and writer
- Henry Porter (MP) (1613–?), English politician, member of parliaments under Cromwell
- Henry Porter (younger) (1636–?), English politician
- Henry Porter (baseball) (1858–1906), American baseball player
- Henry Porter (Canadian admiral) (1922–2016), Canadian admiral
- Henry Porter (cricketer) (c.1810–1878), English cricketer
- Henry Porter (journalist) (born 1953), English author of thrillers and journalist
- Henry Porter (playwright) (died 1599), English dramatist
- Henry Porter (rugby league) (1910–1990), Australian rugby league footballer
- Henry Porter (younger) (born c.1636), English politician, son of Henry Porter born 1613
- Henry Kirke Porter (1840–1921), American politician from Pennsylvania
- Henry Martyn Porter (1835–1907), Union Army officer of the American Civil War
- Henry Rinaldo Porter (1848–1903), American army surgeon
- H. V. Porter (Henry Porter, 1891–1975), American educator and athletics administrator
- Herbert Porter (born 1938), American campaign aide to Richard Nixon
- Homa J. Porter (1896–1986), American businessman and political activist
- Horace Porter (1837–1921), Union Army general in the American Civil War and railroad executive
- Horace A. Porter (1879–1953), Canadian politician
- Howard Porter (artist), American comic book artist
- Howard Porter (basketball) (1948–2007), American basketball player
- Hugh Porter (born 1940), British cyclist and sports commentator
- Hugh Porter (cricketer) (1911–1982), English cricketer
- Hugh Porter (poet) (1780–1812), Scots-Irish weaver and poet
- Hugh Porter (Wisconsin politician) (1843–1936), American politician in Wisconsin
- H. V. Porter (died 1975), American educator and athletics administrator

== I ==
- Ian Porter (actor) (born 1965), English actor
- Ian Porter (rower), Australian lightweight rower
- Ian Porter (politician) (1950–1999), Australian local politician
- Ian Porter (rugby union) (born 1988), Irish rugby union footballer
- Irv Porter (1888–1971), American baseball player
- Ivan Porter (1918–1990), Australian rules footballer
- Ivor Porter (1913–2012), British diplomat and author

== J ==
- Jack Nusan Porter (born 1944), Ukrainian and American writer, sociologist and activist
- Jack Porter (footballer) (born 2008), English footballer
- Jack Porter (political activist) (1896–1986), Texas businessman and political activist
- Jake Porter (1916–1993), American jazz trumpeter and record producer
- Jalina Porter, American political adviser
- James Porter (Australian politician) (born 1950), Member of the Australian House of Representatives
- James Porter (Catholic priest) (1935–2005), defrocked American priest and child molester
- James Porter (cricketer) (fl.1844–1845), English cricketer
- James Porter (diplomat) (1710–1776), British diplomat
- James Porter (Jacobite) (fl.1686–1701), Vice-Chamberlain of King James II of England who followed him into exile
- James Porter (New Brunswick politician) (1847–1926), farmer, miller and political figure in New Brunswick, Canada
- James Porter (New York politician) (1787–1839), American politician from New York
- James Porter (Presbyterian minister) (1753–1798), Irish presbyterian minister and satirist
- James Porter (Master of Peterhouse, Cambridge) (1827–1900), British academic
- James Ezekiel Porter (1847–1876), American army officer killed in the Battle of the Little Bighorn
- James Frederick Porter (1855–1919), Australian engineer and mine manager
- James Herbert Porter (died 1973), English brewer and brewing executive
- James Madison Porter (1793–1862), American cabinet secretary
- James Madison Porter III (1864–1928), American civil engineer
- James Ward Porter, American Reconstruction era politician in Georgia
- James A. Porter (1905–1970), American art historian
- James A. Porter (novelist) (1836–1897), American novelist
- James D. Porter (1828–1912), American attorney, Confederate Army officer and politician
- James E. Porter (1857–1946), mayor of Kansas City, Kansas
- James W. Porter (judge) (1887–1959), American judge
- James W. Porter (ecologist) (born 1946), American ecologist
- James W. Porter II (born 1949), American lawyer and gun rights activist
- James W. Porter (politician) (fl. 1940s), American politician from New York
- Jamie Porter (born 1993), English cricketer
- Jane Porter (1776–1850), Scottish novelist and dramatist
- Jane Porter (romance author), American fiction author
- Janie Porter Barrett (1865–1948), American social reformer, educator and welfare worker
- Janet Porter (born 1962), American conservative activist and author
- Janet Street-Porter (born 1946), English broadcaster, journalist, writer and media personality
- Jared Porter (born 1979), American baseball executive
- Jarrett Porter (born 1993), American baritone singer
- Jay Porter (1933–2020), American baseball player
- Jean Porter (1922–2018), American actress and writer
- Jean Porter (theologian) (born 1955), American theologian
- Jeff Porter (born 1985), American track and field athlete
- Jeff Porter (politician), American politician from Missouri
- Jenelle Porter, American art curator and author
- Jennie Porter (1879–1936), American educator
- Jennifer Porter, tribal chair of the Kootenai Tribe of Idaho
- Jenny Lind Porter (1927–2020), American poet and teacher
- Jeremiah Porter (born 1998), American actor, dancer and singer
- Jeremy Porter, American guitar player, singer and songwriter
- Jeri Porter (born 1970), American college basketball coach
- Jermain G. Porter (1852–1933), American astronomer
- Jerry Porter (American football) (born 1978), American football player
- Jerry D. Porter (born c.1949), American minister of the Church of the Nazarene
- Jevon Porter, American college basketball player
- Jim Porter (born 1949), Australian rugby league footballer
- Jim Porter (Australian rules footballer) (1892–1936), Australian rules footballer
- Jim Porter (giant) (1811–1859), American tavern keeper and coach driver
- Jimmy Porter (football manager) (1901–1967), British football manager
- Jo Porter, Australian television producer and executive
- Joanna Snowden Porter (1864–1941), American clubwoman
- Jock Porter (John Adam Porter, 1894–1952), Scottish motorcycle racer
- Jody Porter (born 1969), American musician
- Joe Porter (American football) (born 1985), American football player
- Joe Porter (cricketer) (born 1980), English cricketer
- Joe Porter (producer), American record producer and songwriter
- Joe A. Porter, American landscape architect
- Joel Porter (born 1978), Australian soccer player
- Joey Porter (born 1977), American football player
- Joey Porter Jr. (born 2000), American football player
- John Porter (bishop) (died 1819), Anglican bishop in Ireland
- John Porter (footballer, born 1961), Scottish footballer
- John Porter (footballer, born 1886), English footballer
- John Porter (historian), English historian
- John Porter (horseman) (1838–1922), British race horse trainer
- John Porter (ice hockey) (1904–1997), Canadian ice hockey player
- John Porter (Illinois politician) (1935–2022), Illinois politician, U.S. Representative
- John Porter (MP for Maldon) (died c.1660), English lawyer and politician
- John Porter (musician, born 1947), British guitarist, bassist, and producer
- John Porter (musician, born 1950) (born 1950), British musician, composer and songwriter in Poland, partner of Anita Lipnicka
- John Porter (New York politician) (1790–1874), American politician
- John Porter (Pennsylvania politician) (fl. 1810s), Pennsylvania politician, U.S. Representative
- John Porter (portreeve) (1390–1394), English Member of Parliament
- John Porter (settler) (c. 1605–after 1674), founding settler of Portsmouth, Rhode Island
- John Porter (sociologist) (1921–1979), Canadian sociologist
- John Addison Porter (1822–1866), American chemist and physician
- John Addison Porter (Secretary to the President) (1856–1900), American official
- John Clinton Porter (1871–1959), California politician, mayor of Los Angeles
- John Reed Porter (1838–1923), American Medal of Honor recipient
- John Robert Porter (1953–2021), English businessman and philanthropist
- John Scott Porter (1801–1880), Irish biblical scholar and Unitarian minister
- John K. Porter (1819–1892), American lawyer and politician from New York
- John L. Porter (1813–1893), American naval constructor
- John L. Porter (politician) (1828–1897), Wisconsin farmer and legislator
- John W. Porter (1860–1941), Wisconsin politician
- J. Hampden Porter (John Hampden Porter) (1837–1908), American military surgeon
- John Porter-Porter (1855–1939), Northern Ireland unionist politician
- Johnathan Porter (born 1997), American rapper known professionally as Blueface
- Jon Porter (born 1955), American politician
- Jonathan Fantini Porter, American government official and executive
- Jono Porter (1981–2004), Australian freestyle motocross rider
- Jontay Porter (born 1999), American basketball player, brother of Michael Porter Jr.
- Jorgie Porter (born 1987), British actress
- Joseph C. Porter (1809–1863), Confederate officer in the American Civil War
- Josias Leslie Porter (1823–1889), Irish Presbyterian minister, missionary and traveller
- Joyce Porter (1924–1990), English crime fiction author
- Judy Porter, New Zealand soccer player
- Julian Porter (born 1936), Canadian barrister
- Julio Porter (1916–1979), Argentine screenwriter and film director
- J. Roger Porter (1909–1979), American microbiologist

== K ==
- Kalan Porter (born 1985), Canadian singer
- KC Porter (Karl Cameron Porter) (born 1962), American record producer and musician
- Kate Porter (born 1983), Australian rugby union footballer
- Katherine Porter (c.1943–2024), American visual artist
- Katherine Anne Porter (1890–1980), American writer
- Katie Porter, (born 1974), American Congresswoman from California
- Katrina Porter (born 1988), Australian Paralympic swimmer
- Keith R. Porter (1912–1997), American cell biologist
- Kenneth Porter (poet) (1905–1981), American poet and historian
- Kenneth Porter (RAF officer) (1912–2003), senior Royal Air Force officer
- Kenneth Lee Porter (1896–1988), American flying ace
- Keshia Pollack Porter, American injury epidemiologist
- Kevin Porter (actor) (born 1969), American actor and director
- Kevin Porter (American football) (born 1966), American football player and coach
- Kevin Porter (basketball, born 1950) (born 1950), American basketball player
- Kevin Porter (ice hockey) (born 1986), American ice hockey player
- Kevin Porter Jr. (born 2000), American basketball player
- Kerry Porter (born 1964), Italian-American football player
- Kim Porter (1970–2018), American model and actress
- King G. Porter (1921–2012), American politician from Tennessee
- Kirsty-Leigh Porter (born 1988), English actress
- Kris Porter (born 1974), Canadian ice hockey player
- Kris Porter (basketball) (born 1994), Filipino basketball player
- Kristean Porter (born 1971), American freestyle skier
- Kristee Porter (born 1980), American volleyball player and coach
- Kyle Porter (born 1990), Canadian soccer player

== L ==
- Larry Porter (American football) (born 1972), American college football coach
- Larry Porter (musician) (born 1951), American jazz musician and composer
- LePreston Porter (1985–2022), American rapper and singer known professionally as Snootie Wild
- Les Porter (1923–2002), English professional footballer
- Leslie Porter (1920–2005), English business executive
- Levi Porter (born 1987), English footballer
- Lew Porter (composer) (1892–1956), American composer and songwriter
- Lew Porter (gridiron football) (born 1947), American and Canadian football player
- Lew F. Porter (1862–1918), American architect
- Lewis Porter (born 1951), American jazz pianist, composer and author
- Liliana Porter (born 1941), Argentine artist
- Lillian Porter (1917–1997), American film and television actress
- Linda Porter (actress) (1933–2019), American character actress
- Linda Porter (historian) (born 1947), English historian and biographer
- Lisa Porter, American nuclear physicist
- Lisa M. Porter, American materials scientist
- Logan Porter (born 1995), American baseball player
- Louis Dalton Porter (1919–2006), American artist
- Louise Porter (1917–1980), American politician from Kansas
- Lucy Porter (born 1973), English actress and comedian
- Lucy Wallace Porter (1876–1962), American photographer
- Ludovic Porter (1869–1928), British colonial administrator in India
- Lulu Porter (born 1940), American actress and singer
- Lyman W. Porter (1930–2015), American academic administrator

== M ==
- MacKenzie Porter (born 1990), Canadian country singer, songwriter and actress
- Maggie Porter (1853–1942), American singer
- Manuia Porter (born 1948), Samoan lawn bowler
- Margaret Porter, American politician from New Hampshire
- Margaret Grey Porter (died 1881), Irish philanthropist
- Marguerite Porter (born 1948), English ballet dancer, actress and choreographer
- Marie Porter (born 1939), Australian writer
- Marina Oswald Porter (born 1941), Russian–American wife of Lee Harvey Oswald
- Mario Porter (born 1980), American basketball player
- Marjorie Porter, American politician
- Mark Porter (anaesthetist) (born 1962), British consultant anaesthetist
- Mark Porter (designer) (born 1960), British publication art director
- Mark Porter (footballer) (born 1976), Australian rules footballer
- Mark Porter (general practitioner) (born 1962), British physician and television and radio presenter
- Mark Porter (racing driver) (1974–2006), New Zealand racing driver
- Mark Porter (writer) (born 1960), Scottish travel writer and publisher
- Marshall Porter (1874–1900), Irish barrister and sportsman, son of Sir Andrew Porter
- Martin Porter, British computer scientist
- Marvin Porter (1924–2002), American stock car racing driver
- Mary Porter (actress) (died 1765), English actress
- Mary Porter (politician) (born 1942), Australian politician
- Mary Bea Porter (born 1949), American golfer
- Mary Winearls Porter (1886–1980), English crystallographer and geologist
- Mary G. Porter (1884–1972), American social worker
- Mason Porter (born 1976), American mathematician
- Matthew Porter (1858–1906), American baseball player
- Matthew Porter (bishop) (born 1969), British Anglican bishop
- Max Porter (footballer) (born 1987), English footballer
- Max Porter (animator) (born 1981), American animator and filmmaker
- Max Porter (writer) (born 1981), English author
- Meisha Ross Porter (born 1973), American educator
- Melinda Camber Porter (1953–2008), British artist, writer and filmmaker
- Melissa Porter (born 1972), English television presenter
- Michael Porter (born 1947), American businessman and academic
- Michael Porter Jr. (born 1998), American basketball player
- Michael Porter (cricketer) (born 1995), English cricketer
- Michael Porter (footballer) (born 1945), Australian rules footballer
- Michael Porter (rugby league) (born 1964), Australian rugby league footballer
- Michael Porter (wrestling) (1951–2010), American professional wrestling ring announcer
- Michael G. Porter (born 1943), Australian economist
- Michelle Porter, Canadian writer
- Mick Porter (born 1945), English footballer
- Mikey Porter (born 2007), British racing driver
- Miracle Porter (born 1998), American soccer player
- Monica Porter, Hungarian-British journalist
- Montel Vontavious Porter (born 1973), American professional wrestler, submission grappler and manager
- Monty Porter (born 1965), Australian rugby league footballer
- Moses Porter (1756–1822), American general of the War of 1812
- Muriel Porter (born 1948), Australian journalist
- Murray Porter (1909–1993), Australian politician
- Myles Porter (born 1985), American paralympic judoka

== N ==
- Natalie Porter (born 1980), Australian basketball player
- Natalie Porter (historian), Canadian author and historian of women's skateboarding
- Neal Porter, American children's book editor and publisher
- Neale Porter, British colonial governor
- Ned Porter (1912–1978), Irish hurler
- Ned Porter (baseball) (1905–1968), American baseball player
- Nelson D. Porter (1863–1961), mayor of Ottawa, Canada
- Newton Hazelton Porter (1877–1945), American judge
- Nigel Porter, English politician from Leicester
- Noah Porter (1811–1892), American educator, philosopher and abolitionist
- Noelle Porter (born 1970), American tennis player
- Nolan Porter (1949–2021), American R&B singer and songwriter
- Norman Porter (1919–1991), Northern Ireland loyalist politician
- Nyree Dawn Porter (1936–2001), New Zealand-born actress

== O ==
- Odie Porter (1877–1903), American baseball pitcher
- Olivia Porter (cricketer) (born 2001), Australian cricketer
- Ora F. Porter (1879–1970), American nurse
- Otto Porter Jr. (born 1993), American basketball player

== P ==
- Pamela Porter (born 1956), Canadian novelist and poet
- Parker Porter (born 1985), American mixed martial artist
- Pat Porter (1959–2012), American long-distance runner
- Patrick Porter, American singer/songwriter, novelist, poet and painter
- Paul Porter (announcer) (born c. 1954), American public address sports announcer
- Paul Porter (biker) (born 1963), Canadian outlaw biker and gangster
- Paul Porter (Michigan politician) (1907–2002), American politician
- Paul Porter (musician) (born 1962), American gospel musician
- Paul A. Porter (1904–1975), American lawyer and politician
- Peter Porter (poet) (1929–2010), Australian-born British poet
- Peter A. Porter (1853–1925), American politician from New York, son of Peter A. Porter the colonel
- Peter A. Porter (colonel) (1827–1864), Union Army colonel in the American Civil War, son of Peter Buell Porter
- P. A. Porter (Peter A. Porter), American college football player
- Peter Buell Porter (1773–1844), American lawyer, soldier and politician
- Peter B. Porter Jr. (1806–1871), American lawyer and politician, son of Augustus Porter, nephew of Peter Buell Porter
- Phil Porter (born 1977), British playwright, librettist and television writer
- Philip S. Porter (1925–2011), American martial artist
- Philip Thomas Porter (1930–2011), American electrical engineer
- Pleasant Porter (1840–1907), American Indian statesman and Principal Chief of the Creek Nation

== Q ==
- Quincy Porter (1897–1966), American composer
- Quincy Porter (American football), American football player
- Quinn Porter (born 1986), American football player
- Quinton Porter (born 1982), American football quarterback

== R ==
- Randy Porter (born 1964), American stock car racing driver
- Ray Porter, American actor
- Ray E. Porter (1891–1963), American Army major general
- Reb Porter, American public address basketball announcer
- Rebecca N. Porter (1883–1963), American author
- Rees W. Porter (1809–1892), American slave trader
- Reggie Porter (born 1994), American football player
- Rep Porter (born 1971), American professional poker player
- Reuben Porter (born 1997), Cook Islands rugby league footballer
- Rex Porter (1931–2003), English athlete
- Rich Porter (1965–1990), American gangster
- Ricky Porter (born 1960), American football player
- Rob Porter (born 1977), American lawyer and White House staffer
- Robert Porter (Australian footballer) (born 1942), Australian rules footballer
- Robert Porter (bishop) (fl.1947–1989), Australian Anglican Bishop of The Murray
- Robert Porter (Brisbane politician) (c.1825–1902), mayor of Brisbane Municipal Council, Queensland, Australia
- Robert Porter (British Army officer) (1858–1928), British Army general and medical officer
- Robert Porter (economist) (born 1955), American economist at Northwestern University
- Robert Porter (English footballer) (fl. 1888–1889), footballer for Blackburn Rovers
- Robert Porter (Northern Ireland politician) (1923–2014), Northern Irish politician
- Robert Porter (Ontario politician) (1833–1901), member of the Canadian Parliament
- Robert Porter (sword-cutler) (after 1603–1648), supplied Parliament swords during the English Civil War
- Robert Evelyn Porter (1913–1983), Australian stockbroker and mayor of Adelaide
- Robert Harold Porter (1933–2018), member of the Canadian Parliament from Alberta
- Robert John Porter (1867–1922), Canadian politician from British Columbia
- Robert Ker Porter (1777–1842), British archaeologist and diplomat
- Robert Percival Porter (1852–1917), British-American journalist and statistician
- Robert William Porter (1926–1991), American judge
- Robert W. Porter Jr. (1908–2000), American Army general
- Robert W. Porter (neurosurgeon) (1926–2021), American neurosurgeon
- Robie Porter (1941–2021), Australian musician, producer and record label owner
- Robyn Porter (born 1966), American politician
- Rodney Porter (1917–1985), British biochemist
- Roger B. Porter (born 1946), American business academic
- Ronald Porter (born 1956), Scottish actor known professionally as Ron Donachie
- Rose Porter (1845–1906), American novelist
- Rose Porter also Rose McDowall (born 1959), Scottish musician
- Ross Porter (Canadian broadcaster), Canadian music journalist and broadcast executive
- Ross Porter (sportscaster) (born 1938), American sportscaster
- Roy Porter (1946–2002), British historian of medicine
- Roy Porter (drummer) (1923–1998), American jazz drummer
- Roy Porter (footballer) (1917–1998), Australian rules footballer
- Roy Porter (priest) (1921–2006), British Anglican priest
- Rudy Porter (born 2000), Australian racing cyclist
- Rufus Porter (painter) (1792–1884), American painter, inventor, and founder of Scientific American magazine
- Rufus Porter (American football) (born 1965), American football player
- Russell Porter (actor) (born 1964), actor on British television in the 1990s
- Russell W. Porter (1871–1949), American artist, engineer, architect, cartographer, amateur astronomer and Arctic explorer
- Ruth Porter (1939–2014), English golfer
- Ruth Porter, Baroness Porter of Fulwood (born 1982), British political adviser and life peer
- Ryan Porter (1979–2026), American jazz trombonist

== S ==
- Samuel Porter, Baron Porter (1877–1956), British judge
- Samuel Clarke Porter (1875–1956), Northern Ireland politician and judge
- Sarah Porter (1813–1900), American educator
- Scott Porter (born 1979), American actor
- Scott Porter (rugby league) (born 1985), Australian rugby league footballer
- Sean Porter (American football) (born 1991), American football player
- Sean Porter (cinematographer), American cinematographer
- Selwyn Porter (1905–1963), Australian Army officer
- Shanelle Porter (born 1972), American sprinter
- Shawn Porter (born 1987), American boxer and sports commentator
- Sheena Porter (born 1935), British author of children's novels
- Shirley Porter (born 1930), British politician
- Shlomo Porter, American rabbi
- Silas Wright Porter (1857–1937), American judge
- Simon Porter (cricketer) (1950–2017), English cricketer
- Simon Porter (MP) (fl.1421–1451), English Member of Parliament
- Stacey Porter (born 1982), Australian softball player
- Stanley E. Porter (born 1956), American-Canadian academic and New Testament scholar
- Stephen Porter (director) (1925–2013), American stage and television director
- Stephen Porter (professor), British dentistry academic
- Stephen C. Porter (1934–2015), American geologist
- Stephen G. Porter (1869–1930), American politician from Pennsylvania
- Steve Porter (producer) (born c.1978), American music video producer and DJ
- Steve Porter (singer) (1863–1936), American recording artist
- Steve Porter (wheelchair rugby) (born 1969), Australian paralympic wheelchair rugby union footballer
- Steven Porter (Canadian politician) (born 1945), Canadian politician from New Brunswick
- Susan H. Porter (born 1955), American LDS Church official
- Susannah M. Porter, American paleontologist and geobiologist
- Susie Porter (born 1970 or 1971), Australian actress
- Sylvia Porter (1913–1991), American financial columnist

== T ==
- Tajuan Porter (born 1988), American basketball player
- Taylor Porter (born 1997), American soccer player
- Terry Porter (born 1963), American basketball player and coach
- Terry Porter (athlete) (born 1951), American pole vaulter
- Terry Porter (cross-country skier) (born 1953), American cross-country skier
- Terry Porter (sound engineer) (born 1954), American sound engineer
- Thea Porter (1927–2000), British artist, fashion designer and retailer
- Theodore M. Porter (born 1954), American historian of science
- Thomas Porter (cardiologist), American cardiologist
- Thomas Porter (dramatist) (1636–1680), English dramatist and duellist
- Thomas Porter (MP) (died 1522), English politician
- Thomas Porter (Vermont politician) (1734–1833), Connecticut and Vermont military and political figure
- Thomas Porter (Wisconsin politician) (1830–?), Wisconsin political figure
- Thomas Colley Porter (1780–1833), British businessman, mayor of Liverpool
- Thomas Conrad Porter (1822–1901), American botanist and theologian
- Thomas William Porter (1843–1920), New Zealand soldier and land purchase officer
- Thomas F. Porter (1847–1927), American politician from Massachusetts
- Tiffany Porter (born 1987), British-American track and field athlete
- Tim Porter (born 1974), British film editor
- Timothy H. Porter (1785–1845), American politician from New York
- Tiran Porter (born 1948), American musician, member of The Doobie Brothers
- Todd Porter (actor) (born 1968), American child actor and model
- Todd Porter (politician) (born 1960), American politician from North Dakota
- Tom Porter (coach) (1929–2013), American football and ice hockey coach
- Tom Porter (computer scientist), programmer at Pixar
- Tony Porter (born 1952), British Bishop of Sherwood
- Tracy Porter (born 1986), American football player
- Tracy Porter (wide receiver) (born 1959), American football player, social activist and entrepreneur
- Tracey Porter, American children's book author
- Trevor Porter (born 1956), English footballer
- Troy Porter (1855–1929), American politician and civil rights leader in Illinois

== U ==
- Una Porter (1900–1996), Australian psychiatrist and philanthropist

== V ==
- Vernon Carroll Porter (1896–1982), American artist

== W ==
- Walter Porter (c.1587–1659), English church musician and composer
- Walter Porter (runner) (1903–1979), British athlete
- Warren P. Porter, American biophysical ecologist and environmental toxicologist
- Warren R. Porter (1861–1927), American politician from California
- Whitworth Porter (1827–1892), English major-general
- Will Porter (born 1998), English rugby union footballer
- William Porter (bishop) (1887–1966), English Catholic archbishop in what is now Ghana
- William Porter (Attorney General) (1805–1880), attorney-general of the Cape Colony
- William Porter (bishop) (1887–1966), English Catholic bishop in West Africa
- William Porter (hurdler) (1926–2000), American track and field athlete
- William Porter (organist) (born 1946), American organist and improviser
- William Porter (fl. 1388), English Member of Parliament
- William Porter (died 1436), English Member of Parliament
- William Porter (died c. 1593), English Member of Parliament
- William Archer Porter (1825–1890), British lawyer and educationist
- William Dennison Porter (1810–1883), South Carolina lieutenant governor
- William Field Porter (1784–1869), New Zealand politician
- William Haldane Porter (1867–1944), British civil servant
- William Henry Porter (surgeon) (1790–1861), president of the Royal College of Surgeons in Ireland
- William Henry Porter (writer) (1817–1861), American minister and writer
- William Sydney Porter (1862–1910), American writer as O. Henry
- William Thomas Porter (1877–1928), British barrister and colonial judge
- William Townsend Porter (1862–1949), American physician, physiologist and medical educator
- William Wood Porter (1826–1907), American military officer and jurist
- William A. Porter (1928–2015), American founder of the E*Trade financial services company
- William D. Porter (1808–1864), flag officer of the United States Navy
- William G. Porter, American police officer
- William H. Porter (1861–1926), American banker
- William J. Porter (1914–1988), British-American diplomat
- William N. Porter (1886–1973), American Army major general
- William T. Porter (1809–1858), American newspaper journalist and editor
- William W. Porter (1856–1928), American attorney and legal author
- Willie Porter (basketball) (born 1942), American basketball player
- Willie Porter (English footballer) (1884–?), English footballer
- Willie Porter (Scottish footballer), Scottish footballer in the Scottish League and American Soccer League
- Willy Porter (born 1964), American singer-songwriter
- Woodford Porter (1918–2006), African American bank director
- W. Arthur Porter (born 1941), American educator and businessman

== Y ==
- Yank Porter (c.1895–1944), American jazz drummer

== Z ==
- Zahir Porter (born 2000), American basketball player
