= Robert Porter =

Robert, Rob, Bob or Bobby Porter may refer to:

== Politics ==
- Robert Porter (Brisbane politician) (c. 1825–1902), alderman and mayor of Brisbane Municipal Council, Queensland, Australia
- Robert Porter (Ontario politician) (1833–1901), member of the Canadian Parliament from Ontario
- Robert John Porter (1867–1922), mayor of Victoria, British Columbia, Canada
- Sir Robert Evelyn Porter (1913–1983), generally known as "Tom", stockbroker and mayor of Adelaide
- Sir Robert Porter (Northern Ireland politician) (1923–2014), Northern Irish politician
- Robert Harold Porter (1933–2018), member of the Canadian Parliament from Alberta
- Rob Porter (born 1977), American White House staffer in the Trump administration

== Sport ==
- Robert Porter (English footballer) (fl. 1888–1889), footballer for Blackburn Rovers
- Bobby Porter, Canadian football player who played in 1940 in Canadian football
- Robert Porter (Australian footballer) (born 1942), Australian rules footballer for Hawthorn
- Bob Porter (footballer) (born 1942), Australian rules footballer for South Melbourne
- Bob Porter (baseball) (born 1959), American Major League Baseball player for Atlanta Braves

== Others ==
- Robert Porter (sword-cutler) (after 1603–1648), supplied Parliament with up to 15,000 swords during the English Civil War and probably fought at the Battle of Birmingham (1643)
- Sir Robert Ker Porter (1777–1842), British archaeologist and diplomat
- Robert Percival Porter (1852–1917), British-born American journalist and statistician
- Sir Robert Porter (British Army officer) (1858–1928), British Army general and medical officer
- Robert Russell Porter (1908–1986), American radio, television and theater actor and director
- Robert W. Porter Jr. (1908–2000), U.S. Army general
- Robert Porter (bishop) (fl. 1947–1989), Australian Anglican Bishop of The Murray
- Robert W. Porter (neurosurgeon) (born 1926), American neurosurgeon
- Robert William Porter (1926–1991), U.S. federal judge
- Bob Porter (record producer) (1940–2021), American blues record producer and radio presenter
- Robert Porter (economist) (born 1955), American economist at Northwestern University
- Robert Odawi Porter, president of the Seneca Nation of New York
- Robert Niel Porter, writer of Santa and the Fairy Snow Queen
- Bobby Porter, actor in Quark
- Bob Porter, character in the UK TV series Teachers
