= Henry Porter =

Henry Porter may refer to:

== Politicians ==
- Henry Porter (MP) (1613–?), English politician who sat in the House of Commons in 1654 and 1656
- Henry Porter (younger) (1636–?), English politician who sat in the House of Commons in 1659
- Henry Kirke Porter (1840–1921), U.S. Representative from Pennsylvania
- Henry Porter (MP for Coventry), see Coventry

== Others ==
- H. V. Porter (Henry Porter, 1891–1975), American educator and athletic administrator
- Henry Porter (baseball) (1858–1906), 19th century baseball player
- Henry Porter (Canadian admiral) (1922–2016), Canadian admiral
- Henry Porter (cricketer) (1810–1878), English cricketer
- Henry Porter (journalist) (born 1953), author of thrillers and journalist
- Henry Porter (playwright) (died 1599), dramatist
- Henry Porter (rugby league) (1910–1990), Australian rugby league footballer
- Henry Martyn Porter (1835–1907), Civil War colonel and commander of the 7th Vermont Volunteer Infantry
- Henry Rinaldo Porter (1848–1903), acting assistant surgeon in the 7th U.S. Cavalry at the Battle of the Little Big Horn
