= Thomas Porter =

Thomas or Tom Porter may refer to:

- Thomas Porter (MP) (died 1522), English MP for Gloucester, 1515
- Thomas Porter (dramatist) (1636–1680), English dramatist and duellist
- Thomas Porter (Vermont politician) (1734–1833), Connecticut and Vermont military and political figure
- Thomas Colley Porter (1780–1833), mayor of Liverpool, England
- Thomas Porter (Wisconsin politician) (1830–?), Wisconsin political figure
- Thomas William Porter (1843–1920), New Zealand soldier and land purchase officer
- Thomas F. Porter (1847–1927), Massachusetts politician and mayor of Lynn, Massachusetts
- Tom Porter (coach) (1929–2013), American football and ice hockey coach
- Thomas Porter (cardiologist), American cardiologist
- Tom Porter (computer scientist), computer programmer at Pixar
- Robert Evelyn Porter (1913–1983), a.k.a. Tom Porter, Australian businessman and mayor of Adelaide, 1968–1971
- Thomas Conrad Porter (1822–1901), American botanist and theologian
