= John Porter =

John Porter may refer to:

== Politicians ==
- John Porter (Illinois politician) (1935–2022), Illinois politician, U.S. Representative
- John Porter (MP for Bramber) (died 1599), MP for Bramber
- John Porter (MP for Maldon) (died 1660), English lawyer and politician who sat in the House of Commons in 1640
- John Porter (New York politician) (1790–1874), New York politician
- John Porter (Pennsylvania politician) (fl. 1810s), Pennsylvania politician, U.S. Representative
- John Porter (portreeve) (1390–1394), MP for Taunton
- John Addison Porter (Secretary to the President) (1856–1900), first Secretary to the President
- John Clinton Porter (1871–1959), California politician, mayor of Los Angeles
- John K. Porter (1819–1892), American lawyer and politician from New York
- John L. Porter (politician) (1828–1897), Wisconsin farmer and legislator
- John W. Porter (1860–1941), Wisconsin politician

== Sports ==
- John Porter (horseman) (1838–1922), trainer in British Thoroughbred flat racing
- Jock Porter (John Adam Porter, 1894–1952), Scottish motorcycle racer
- John Porter (ice hockey) (1904–1997), ice hockey player
- John Porter (footballer, born 1961), Scottish footballer
- John Porter (footballer, born 1886), English footballer

== Musicians ==
- John Porter (musician, born 1950) (born 1950), ex-partner of Anita Lipnicka
- John Porter (musician, born 1947), British guitarist, bassist, and producer

== Others ==
- John Porter (settler) (c. 1605–after 1674), founding settler of Portsmouth, Rhode Island
- John Porter (bishop) (died 1819), Anglican bishop in Ireland
- John Addison Porter (1822–1866), United States professor of chemistry
- John L. Porter (1813–1893), American naval constructor
- John Porter (sociologist) (1921–1979), Canadian sociologist
- John Robert Porter (1953–2021), English billionaire businessman and philanthropist
- John Scott Porter (1801–1880), Irish biblical scholar and Unitarian minister
- John Reed Porter (1838–1923), Medal of Honor recipient
- John Porter (historian), English historian

== See also ==
- Jack Porter (disambiguation)
- Jon Porter (born 1955), US congressman from Nevada
- John Porter Stakes, British flat horse race, named for the trainer
- John Porter-Porter (1855–1939), Northern Irish politician
- Preston John Porter Jr. (1885–1900), American lynching victim
