= Jono =

Jono may refer to:

== Railway stations ==
- Jōno Station (JR Kyushu), a railway station in Kokuraminami-ku, Kitakyushu, Japan
- Jōno Station (Kitakyushu Monorail), a Monorail station in Kokuraminami-ku, Kitakyushu, Japan

== Media ==
- Jono (video game), a 2026 video game

=== Fictional characters ===
- Jono (Star Trek)
- Jono (Hollyoaks)

== People with the name ==
- Jono Beech (born 1990), Australian rules footballer
- Jono Boult (born 1985), New Zealand cricketer
- Jono Broome, British paracanoeist who has competed since the late 2000s
- Jono Carroll (born 1992), Irish boxer
- Jono Dorr (born 1990), American singer, songwriter, multi-instrumentalist and record producer
- Jono Gibbes (born 1977), current director of rugby at La Rochelle
- Jono Grant (Canadian musician) (born 1969), Canadian composer, producer and multi-instrumentalist
- Jono Hickey (born 1991), New Zealand sportsman who currently represents in cricket and rugby union
- Jono Howard, Canadian-born writer who works primarily on animated children's shows
- Jono Jenkins (born 1986), Australian rugby union footballer
- Jono Kitto (born 1992), New Zealand rugby union player
- Jono Lance (born 1990), Australian rugby union player
- Jono Lester (born 1989), New Zealand racing driver
- Jono Macbeth (born 1973), New Zealand yachtsman
- Jono McLean (born 1980), South African cricketer
- Jono Naylor (born 1960s), New Zealand politician
- Jono Owen (born 1986), rugby union player
- Jono Porter (1981–2004)
- Jono Pryor (born 1981), New Zealand radio and television personality
- Jono Ross (born 1990), South African rugby union player
- Jono van Hazel (born 1978), Australian swimmer

== See also ==
- Johno (disambiguation)
- Jonno
