= Charlie Porter =

Charlie Porter may refer to:

- Charlie Porter (mountaineer) (1950–2014), American mountaineer and climate change scientist
- Charlie Porter (trumpeter) (born 1978), American trumpeter, composer and music educator
- Charlie Porter (journalist) (born 1973), British fashion journalist

== See also ==
- Charles Porter (disambiguation)
