= Jonno =

Jonno is a nickname in the English language. In Australian and New Zealand English, it is a diminutive of the name Jonathan. It may refer to:

- Jonno Davies (born 1992), English actor
- Jonno Devlin (born 1976), Irish rower
- Jonno Duniam (born 1982), Australian politician

== See also ==
- Johno
- Jono
