= Charles Porter =

Charles Porter may refer to:

- Charles Porter (Australian politician) (1910–2004), member for Toowong in the Queensland Legislative Assembly, Australia
- Charles Porter (Lord Chancellor of Ireland) (1631–1696)
- Charles Porter (Pennsylvania politician) (1756–1830), speaker of the Pennsylvania House of Representatives, 1806
- Charles H. Porter (mayor), owner of the Boston Red Stockings, 1873–1874, mayor of Quincy, Massachusetts
- Charles Ethan Porter (1848–1923), American still life painter
- Charles H. Porter (Virginia politician) (1833–1897), U.S. representative from Virginia
- Charles O. Porter (1919–2006), Oregon politician
- Charles W. Porter (1849–1891), secretary of state of Vermont
- Charles Talbot Porter (1826–1910), American lawyer, engineer, and inventor of mechanical devices
- Charlie Porter (trumpeter) (Charles William Porter, born 1978), American trumpeter, composer and music educator
- Chilla Porter (Charles Michael Porter, 1936–2020), 1956 Australian Olympic silver medalist in high jump
- Christian Porter (Charles Christian Porter, born 1970), member of the Australian Parliament for Pearce
- Charles Porter IV, photographer who won the Pulitzer Prize for Breaking News Photography

== See also ==
- Chuck Porter (disambiguation)
- Charlie Porter (disambiguation)
