= Billy Porter (disambiguation) =

Billy Porter (born 1969) is an American actor and singer.

Billy Porter may also refer to:

- Billy Porter (criminal) (1850–?), an American burglar and underworld figure in New York City
- Billy Porter (Australian footballer) (1875–1910), an Australian rules footballer
- Billy Porter (footballer, born 1905) (1905–1946), an English footballer
- "Billy Porter", a song by Mick Ronson from the 1975 album Play Don't Worry

== See also ==
- Bill Porter (disambiguation)
- William Porter (disambiguation)
