= John S. Porter =

John S. Porter may refer to:

- John Scott Porter (1801–1880), Irish biblical scholar and Unitarian minister
- John Porter (footballer, born 1961), Scottish former footballer
