= William Porter =

William Porter may refer to:

== Law and politics ==
- William Dennison Porter (1810–1883), South Carolina lieutenant governor
- William Porter (Attorney General) (1805–1880), attorney-general of the Cape Colony
- William Field Porter (1784–1869), New Zealand politician
- William G. Porter, American police officer
- William J. Porter (1914–1988), American diplomat; former ambassador to Canada and Saudi Arabia, among others
- William Archer Porter (1825–1890), British lawyer and educationist
- William Haldane Porter (1867–1944), British civil servant
- William Porter (died c. 1593), member (MP) of the Parliament of England for Grantham, Bletchingley, and Helston
- William Porter (fl. 1388), member of parliament (MP) for Southwark
- William Porter (died 1436), MP for Cambridgeshire
- William W. Porter (1856–1928), American attorney and legal author
- William Wood Porter (1826–1907), American military officer and jurist
- William Thomas Porter (1877–1928), British barrister and colonial judge

== Medicine ==
- William Townsend Porter (1862–1949), American physician, physiologist, and medical educator
- William Henry Porter (surgeon) (1790–1861), president of the Royal College of Surgeons in Ireland

== Military officers ==
- William D. Porter (1808–1864), flag officer of the United States Navy
  - USS William D. Porter (DD-579), ship named after him
- William N. Porter (1886–1973), U.S. Army Major General and chief of the Army Chemical Warfare Service during World War II
- William Wood Porter (1826–1907), American military officer and jurist

== Music ==
- William Porter (organist) (born 1946), American organist and improviser
- Willy Porter (born 1964), American singer-songwriter
- Billy Porter (William Ellis Porter II, born 1969), American singer, actor, writer and director

== Religion ==
- William Porter (bishop) (1887–1966), English Roman Catholic archbishop in present-day Ghana
- William Henry Porter (writer) (1817–1861), American minister and writer

== Others ==
- William H. Porter (1861–1926), banker in New York City
- William Porter (hurdler) (1926–2000), American track and field hurdler
- William Porter (hurdler, born 1973), American hurdler, bronze medalist in the 400 m hurdles at the 1992 World Junior Championships in Athletics
- William Sydney Porter (1862–1910), American writer who used the pen name O. Henry
  - William Sydney Porter Elementary School, school in Greensboro, North Carolina
- William T. Porter (1809–1858), American writer and founder of Spirit of the Times
- William A. Porter (1928–2015), American businessman and entrepreneur, founder of E*TRADE
- Bill Porter (salesman) (William Douglas Porter, 1932–2013), American salesman with cerebral palsy
- Willie Porter (English footballer) (William Alfred Porter, 1884–?)
- Willie Porter (Scottish footballer) (William Porter, fl. 1913–24)
- Will Porter (William Porter, born 1998), English rugby union player

== See also ==
- Bill Porter (disambiguation)
- Billy Porter (disambiguation)
- Willie Porter (disambiguation)
