= Chuck Porter =

Chuck Porter may refer to:

- Chuck Porter (baseball) (born 1955), American player in Major League Baseball
- Chuck Porter (politician) (born 1964), Canadian politician
- Chuck Porter (executive), American advertising executive, marketer and author

== See also ==
- Charles Porter (disambiguation)
