= Tokyo Paralympics =

Tokyo Paralympics may refer to:

- 1964 Summer Paralympics
- 2020 Summer Paralympics

== See also ==
- Tokyo bid for the 2016 Summer Paralympics
- Tokyo Olympics (disambiguation)
