= Natalie Porter (historian) =

Canadian librarian, skateboarder, and author

- Porter in 2023
- Occupations: Librarian, skateboarder, author and historian
- Known for: Womxn Skateboard History

Natalie Porter is a Canadian librarian, skateboarder, author and historian of women's skateboarding. In 2022, she founded Womxn Skateboard History, an online archive documenting women and non-binary skateboarders. Her book, Girl Gangs, Zines, and Powerslides: A History of Badass Women Skateboarders, was published by ECW Press in September 2025.

== Early life and education ==
Porter grew up in Owen Sound, Ontario. She began skateboarding in 1995, at age 17, as a summer activity between snowboarding seasons. After moving to British Columbia to attend Simon Fraser University, she joined a group of women who regularly skateboarded at Confederation Skate Park in Burnaby.

While studying at Concordia University, Porter researched women's participation in skateboarding. Her 2003 master's thesis was titled Female Skateboarders and Their Negotiation of Space and Identity. BC BookLook described it as what is believed to be the first academic thesis about women in skateboarding. She later earned a Master of Library and Information Studies degree from the University of British Columbia in 2009.

== Library career ==
Porter worked for the Vancouver Public Library, initially as a library assistant and later as a community librarian. In 2014, she became head of the Carnegie Branch in Vancouver's Downtown Eastside. She held that position until 2018 and then became assistant chief librarian at the Powell River Public Library. In 2023, she joined the British Columbia Library Association as its provincial professional development coordinator.

== Skateboarding history work ==
Porter skateboarding at Go Skateboarding Day 2023 at Powell River Skate Park in British Columbia, Canada

Porter's interest in the history of women skateboarders grew out of her own participation in skateboarding and her academic research. In Montreal, she was a member of the Skirtboarders, a group that produced videos, a website and the zine Armpit, to which Porter contributed. She later contributed to the skateboarding zine Idlewood. Researchers Steph MacKay and Christine Dallaire subsequently analyzed the Skirtboarders' website and interviews with crew members in the peer-reviewed Sociology of Sport Journal, describing the site as a women-produced space that challenged conventional representations of femininity in skateboarding.

Porter launched Womxn Skateboard History in March 2022. The project collects biographies, photographs, interviews, zines and other records concerning women and non-binary participants in skateboarding. Porter has described zines as especially valuable primary documents; her research also draws on academic databases, newspaper archives, social-media searches and oral-history interviews. Porter has highlighted the work of Bonnie Blouin, Thrasher Magazine's first woman columnist, who co-created the skateboarding zine True Devotion with Gigi Gits. In a 2025 interview, Porter described Blouin's importance to her and said she owned two handwritten letters Blouin had sent to Thrasher in 1986.

The Womxn Skateboard History archive includes recreational as well as professional skateboarders rather than limiting inclusion to prominent competitors or people with large followings. The Skateboarding Hall of Fame and Museum credits Lynn Kramer and Porter with helping make digitized issues of the 1980s women's skateboarding zine Equal Time available through the museum. In a 2025 University of British Columbia interview, Porter said that the archive contained more than 350 biographies organized by decade and documented women's participation in skateboarding as far back as 1959. BUST profiled Porter and the archive in its Winter 2023 issue, and Thrasher profiled Porter and the project in its May 2025 print issue and online the following month.

Porter serves as a subject expert on the Smithsonian's skateboarding advisory board.

== Writing ==
In 2014, Porter self-published the 56-page ebook The History of Women in Skateboarding in Kindle format. She later described the ebook as an early stage in her effort to develop a larger illustrated history, and said that she continued accumulating material after unsuccessful approaches to publishers and literary agents. Her writing has appeared in The Walrus and Closer Skateboarding magazine.

Porter said that the increased attention given to young women skateboarders during the Tokyo and Paris Olympic Games, often with little discussion of earlier generations, helped motivate her to write a broader history of women's participation in skateboarding. Her first full-length book, Girl Gangs, Zines, and Powerslides: A History of Badass Women Skateboarders, developed from her master's research and drew on interviews, photographs, zines and biographical research assembled for the Womxn Skateboard History archive. The book examines women and non-binary skateboarders from the 1960s onward, with particular attention to informal networks, zines and community organizing. It combines historical research and interviews with Porter's personal experiences in skateboarding, arguing that women participated throughout skateboarding's history but were marginalized in dominant accounts of the sport by skate media and corporate marketing.

Writing in the University of Chicago Press journal Portable Gray, Isaac Bjorke described the book as both a study of underrepresented skateboarders and an example of public archival work, and discussed its criticism of sexist representation in skateboarding media. Nelson Phillips of Rrampt characterized the book as cultural history focused on women skaters and the do-it-yourself publications through which they documented their communities. Reviewing the book for The British Columbia Review, Myshara McMyn praised its use of firsthand accounts and its emphasis on community and connection, while describing it as fast-paced despite its density.

In 2026, Porter was shortlisted for the Canadian Women's Foundation's Feminist Creator Prize. In 2026, Girl Gangs, Zines, and Powerslides won the debut-book award in the Sunshine Coast Writers and Editors Society's Book Awards for BC Authors.

== Selected works ==
- Female Skateboarders and Their Negotiation of Space and Identity (master's thesis, Concordia University, 2003)
- The History of Women in Skateboarding (self-published ebook, 2014)
- Girl Gangs, Zines, and Powerslides: A History of Badass Women Skateboarders (ECW Press, 2025)
