= Battle of Camp Hill =

Battle in the first English Civil War

Coordinates: 52.471°N 1.879°W

- Part of the First English Civil War
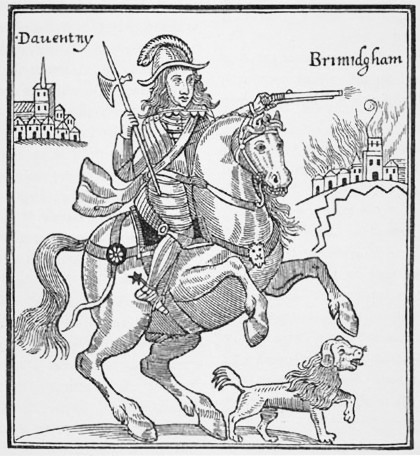
- Prince Rupert shown attacking "Brimidgham", from the Parliamentarian pamphlet A True Relation of Prince Ruperts Barbarous Cruelty against the Towne of Brumingham
Date	3 April 1643
Location	Camp Hill, Birmingham
Result	Royalist victory

Belligerents
Royalists	Parliamentarians

Commanders and leaders
Prince Rupert; Lord Denbigh (DOW)	Captain Richard Greaves

Strength
200 foot 1,200 horse	300 foot Militia

Casualties and losses
c.30	15 men 1–2 women 40 prisoners More than 340 homeless
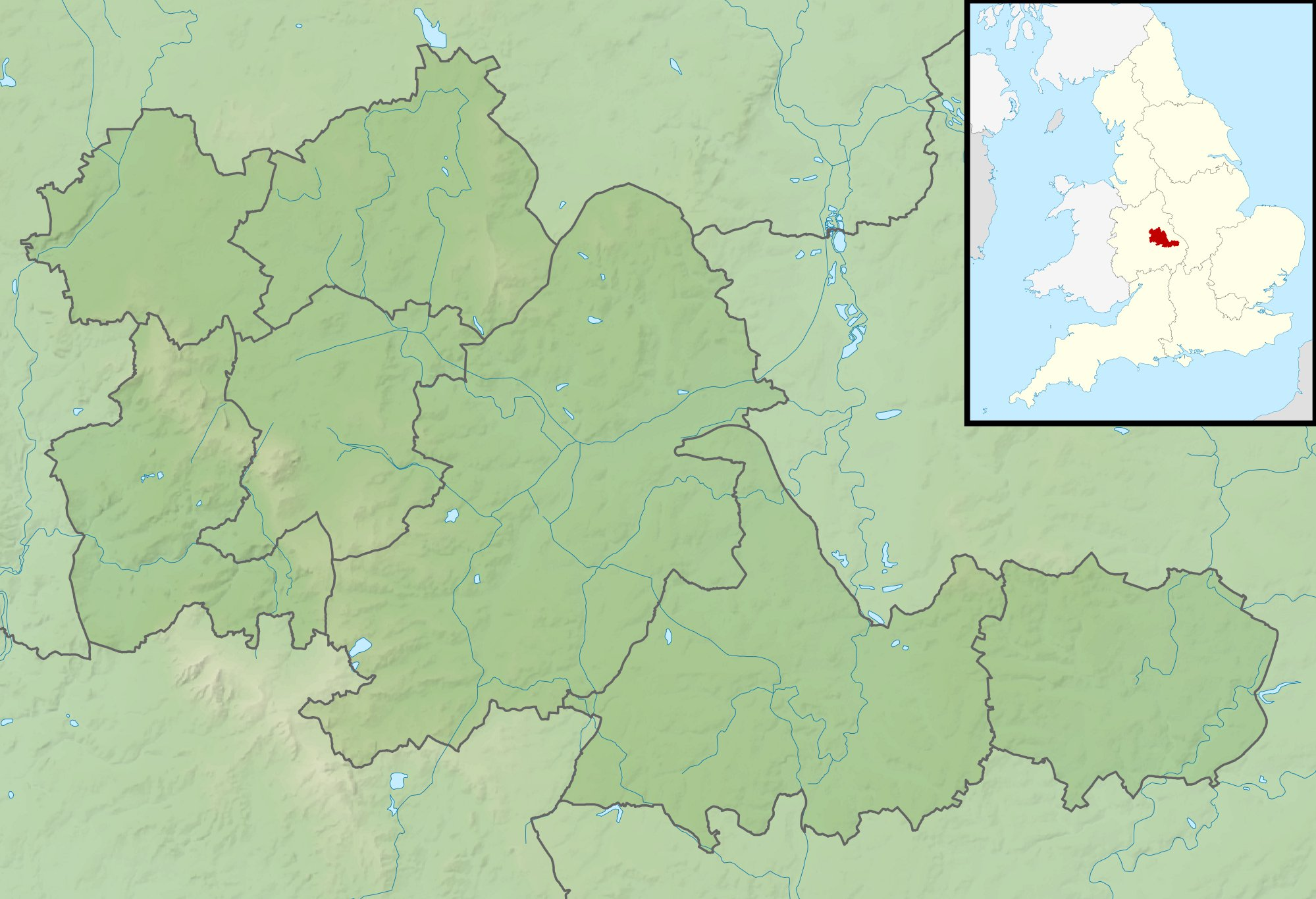
- Camp Hill now located close to Birmingham City centre in the West Midlands

The Battle of Camp Hill, also known as the Battle of Birmingham, took place on Easter Monday, 3 April 1643, in and around Camp Hill, Warwickshire, during the First English Civil War. In the skirmish, a company of Parliamentarians from the Lichfield garrison with the support of some of the local townsmen, approximately 300 men, attempted to stop a detachment of 1,400 Royalists under the command of Prince Rupert from passing through the unfortified parliamentary town of Birmingham.

The Parliamentarians put up a surprisingly stout resistance and, according to the Royalists, shot at them from houses as the small Parliamentary force was driven out of town and back towards Lichfield. To suppress the musket fire, the Royalists torched the houses where they thought the shooting was coming from. After the battle the Royalists spent the remainder of the day pillaging the town. The next morning before the main body of the Royalist force left town, many more houses were put to the torch. While pillaging and firing on an unfortified town in retaliation for resistance was common at that time in Continental Europe it was unusual in England and the Royalists’ conduct in Camp Hill provided the Parliamentarians a propaganda weapon which they used to disparage the Royalists.

== Prelude ==
At the start of the Civil War the area that would become known as the Black Country in North-West Worcestershire and Birmingham was one of the few places in England that could produce the various military stores of which King Charles I was in dire need. As he had failed to secure the arsenals of Portsmouth and Hull, he did not possess any supply of swords, pikes, guns, shot; all these Worcestershire could and did provide. Shot came from Stourbridge and from Dudley cannon. The numerous small forges which then existed on every brook in the north of the County turned out successive supplies of sword blades and pike heads. It is said that among the many causes of anger Charles had against Birmingham was that one of the best sword makers of the day, a man named Robert Porter, who lived and made his blades in Worcestershire but sold them in Birmingham, refused at any price to supply swords for "that man of blood", or any of his adherents. (Note: This was a term used by Independents to describe Charles I who they blamed for the bloodshed of the Civil War. It was taken from the Book of Numbers 35:33 (Farr 2006, p. 125) So ye shall not pollute the land wherein ye are: for blood it defileth the land: and the land cannot be cleansed of the blood that is shed therein, but by the blood of him that shed it. — King James Bible Numbers 35:33)

However, the Royalists had among their adherents Colonel Dud Dudley, who had invented a means of smelting iron by the use of coal, and who claimed he could turn out "all sorts of bar iron fit for making of muskets, carbines, and iron for great bolts", both more cheaply, more speedily and more excellent than could be done in any other way. His method was now employed on the King's behalf.

During the first campaign of the war, while marching from Shrewsbury to engage parliamentarian forces at the Battle of Edgehill on 17 October 1642, Charles passed through Birmingham. The townsfolk seized some of his carriages, containing the royal plate and furniture, which they conveyed for security to Warwick Castle, a parliamentary stronghold. During the first year of the war the inhabitants of Birmingham apprehended all messengers and suspected persons; frequently attacked and reduced small parties of the Royalists, whom they sent prisoners to the fortified city of Coventry (the origin of the proverbial expression, send him to Coventry).

Historian John Willis-Bund, said that one characteristic of Charles were the small acts of vengeance in which he indulged and so among the orders given to Prince Rupert for the Lichfield expedition was that he should teach Birmingham a lesson for their disloyalty, especially for the insults they had put on the King in October, 1642, before the Battle of Edgehill, when they plundered the Royal Coach. Clarendon adds that Birmingham was then: (Note: For the Battle of Camp Hill, Willis-Bund cites Clarendon II pp. 180–181, However different publications use different pagination. II refers to Volume II. This publication has the account on pages 233–234 in Book VII. The Clarendon publication in the references section of this article has an account on the pages 23–26 noting that it is in Book VII 31–33.)

A town of as great fame for hearty, wilful affected disloyalty to the King as any place in England.

— Clarendon.

Rupert's mission was, therefore, threefold. Punish Birmingham, garrison Lichfield, and clear the country as far as possible. To do this he was given a force of 1200 horse and dragoons and 600 or 700 foot.

On Wednesday, 29 March 1643, Rupert left Oxford, reaching Chipping Norton that evening. On Thursday he was at Shipston-on-Stour, on Friday, 31 March (Good Friday) at Stratford-on-Avon, and on Saturday, 1 April (Easter Eve), at Henley-in-Arden. Here he spent Easter Sunday, and on Easter Monday, 3 April, set out for Birmingham to execute the first part of his task. Clarendon says:

[Birmingham] was never made a garrison by direction of Parliament, being built in such a form as was hardly capable of being fortified, yet they had so great a desire to distinguish themselves from the King's good subjects, that they cast up little slight works at both ends of the town, and barricadoed the rest, and voluntarily engaged themselves not to admit any intercourse with the King's forces.

— Clarendon.

So Rupert found it when, on 3 April, he marched there from Henley-in-Arden. After passing Shirley the road entered Worcestershire, then proceeding northwards along one of the great main roads leading into Birmingham, now called the Stratford Road (it is joined at Sparkhill, near where "The Mermaid" public house stood, by the road to Warwick). Here the further approach to Birmingham was barred by some of the slight earthworks which had been thrown up. The men of Birmingham possessed a very inadequate force to defend these works. In the town a small company of foot soldiers under Captain Richard Greaves was stationed. The Lichfield garrison had sent in a troop of horse, but their united strength barely exceeded 200 men. Rupert did not believe that his large body would be opposed by so inferior a force. He therefore sent his Quarter-Master forward to take up his lodgings, and to

assure the townsmen if they behaved themselves peaceably they should not suffer for what was past. But they had not consciences good enough to believe him, and absolutely refused to let him quarter in the town, and from their little works, with mettle equal to their malice, discharged their shot upon him.

— Clarendon.

== Battle ==
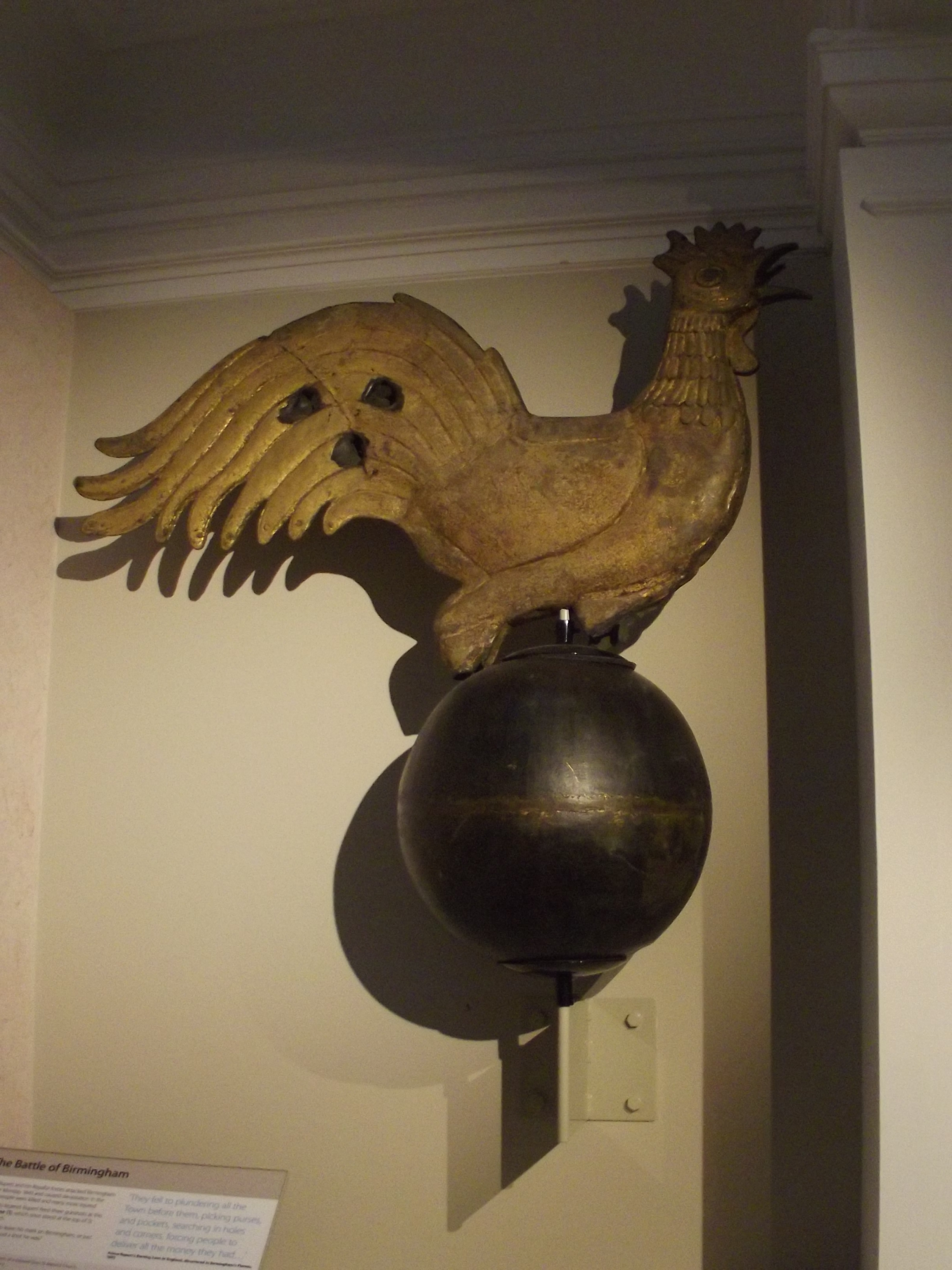
A weather vane reportedly shot by Prince Rupert during the battle

It was about three in the afternoon that Rupert, to his surprise, found that "the sturdy sons of freedom", as the local historians Hutton and Guest called them, were determined to fight. This determination was opposed to the opinion of the Parliamentarians—not only of the military, but also of the civilians—the ministers of Birmingham, and the leading men of the town; but the "middle and inferior sort" of people, especially those that bore arms, insisted on resisting, so at last they all resolved to fight. Finding such was their case, Rupert gave the order to attack their defences at once. The defences were only a bank of earth, behind which the handful of musketeers was placed. As the Royalists advanced they received so heavy a fire that on reaching the works they could not stand up against it and had to retire. A second attempt met with a similar repulse.

Things were getting serious; it would never do for Rupert to be defeated by the inhabitants of Birmingham. Yet there was little chance of carrying the works by a direct attack. Some of Rupert's men saw that it might be possible, by going across the fields, to ride round and get into the rear of the works, and from there charge the defenders. This was tried and proved successful. The defenders of the works could not stand being attacked front and rear, so abandoned the works and fled into the town. Rupert's troopers followed them. From the houses a desultory fire was kept up on the Royalist troopers as they advanced up the street. On this the troopers set fire to the houses from which they had been fired on, and the town was soon ablaze in several places. Pushing on the resistance became less; those who had fought fled and scattered.

However the fight was not over. Captain Richard Greaves rallied his troop of horse, and drawing them up at the further (the Lichfield) end of the town, wheeled them round, and charged the scattered Royalists. Little expecting any resistance, the Royalists gave way. Lord Denbigh, who was leading them, was severely wounded, knocked off his horse, and left for dead; he died five days later from his wounds, and his men fled back helter-skelter till they came near their own colours, and they formed up in the rear of the Royalist lines.

Greaves, having carried out his object, which was by his charge to give time for his foot to get away, and to prevent them being pursued, did not press his success further. He had himself in his charge received no less than five wounds. Reforming his men he faced about, and drew off towards Lichfield. He had saved his soldiers, but he left the unfortunate townsmen to the tender mercies of Rupert's troopers.

Irritated by the resistance, and especially by Greaves' charge, Rupert's men were not inclined to be merciful. They rode round the town, leaping hedges and ditches to catch the townsmen; those they caught they slew. If the lists given are to be trusted, tradesmen, labourers, women were all cut down indiscriminately.

=== Killing of two civilians ===
Two cases were commented on shortly after the battle:

Some of the troopers riding up to an inn, the ostler came out to take their horses, he was cut down and killed.

A minister was slain in the street. Parliamentary supporters said he was mistaken for the minister of Birmingham, a vocal supporter of the Parliamentary cause, and was therefore murdered. The Royalists said that he told the troopers that "the King was a perjured, Papistical King, and that he would rather die than live under such a King", and on hearing this the enraged troopers obliged him by cutting him down.

Parliamentary supporters alleged he had long been a lunatic, held "Jewish opinions", and had been held in Bedlam and other prisons, some said for sixteen and others twenty-two years, and had only recently been released. On him were found a number of "idle and foolish papers", which the Parliament said proved him mad, the Royalists said proved him immoral. Like some other foolish people he kept a diary, and entered in it a number of matters that might well have been left out. "28th March. A comfortable kiss from Mrs. E., with some moistness. A cynamon kiss from a noted woman. A kiss from a girl of 14 years old".

The historian John Willis-Bund states that nothing could show better the feelings of both parties, and it may or may not have been in accordance with the laws of war to have cut down a preacher making disloyal speeches, but to kill in cold blood a man who had in his pocket a journal with doubtful entries was a disgrace even to those wild times.

== Aftermath ==
Rupert did not stay long in Birmingham. On Easter Tuesday, 4 April he marched from Birmingham to Walsall; on the Wednesday he reached Cannock. There he halted until Saturday, 8 April when he marched on to Lichfield and laid siege to the town.

== Battlefield today ==
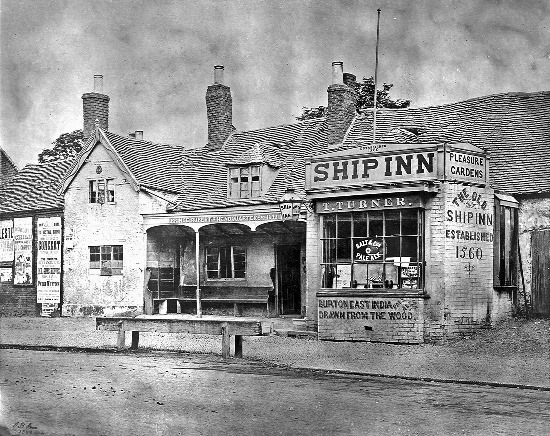
The Ship Inn in the mid-1860s. It was demolished in 1867.

Urban development has claimed the site of the battlefield and no physical trace of the battle remains to this day. The site of the Birmingham earthworks is now a roadway. Prince Rupert's headquarters on the afternoon of the battle, the "Old Ship" public-house according to local tradition, survived into the nineteenth century and has been preserved only by photographs.

== Commentary ==
John Willis-Bund states that the battle of Camp Hill was remarkable from the fact that an armed mob—they were nothing more—twice repulsed assaults of the best troops in the Royalist army, who attacked them in overwhelming numbers. That less than 300 men should keep some 1,800 at bay, even for a short time, was an act that deserved to be recorded; that they, an untrained mob, should have checked the dreaded Royalist cavalry, was a still greater achievement. The Parliamentarians were delighted, and they had reason to be. Captain Greaves, probably a local man, a member of the family that lived at King's Norton, who commanded the Parliament troops, might well be proud of his men's achievement.

Bund also states that nothing that had taken place in the war produced more controversy than the way in which Rupert treated Birmingham, and that it was certainly harsh, but by the laws of war as understood on the Continent, in the school in which Rupert had been brought up, there was nothing illegal or improper in it. If the owners of a house allowed firing from that house on the soldiers of the other side, the soldiers fired on were justified in destroying that house. Burning has always been one of the recognised means of destruction. Bund says that if Birmingham had been a Continental town nothing would ever have been heard of it; but because the Continental laws of war were applied to an English town the outcry was terrible.

Trevor Royal writing in 2004 draws the same conclusions as Bund, and says "By laying waste to the town and setting fire to many of its houses, Rupert's force provided parliament with a propaganda coup ... Charles rebuked Rupert for his men's behaviour — the prince had in fact done his best to curb his men ... but the damage was done: Birmingham had paid the price for supporting parliament and being seen to profit from it".

== Contemporary reports ==
Clarendon's account in his History of the Civil War, written during and after the Civil War and published after the Restoration, show that there were strong feeling on the affair. Clarendon says that Rupert

took not that vengeance upon them they deserved, but made them expiate their transgressions by paying a less mulct than might have been expected from their wealth if their wickedness had been less.

— Clarendon.

Clarendon then justifies the death of the clergyman:

He was killed at the entering of the town, after he had not only refused quarter, but provoked the soldier by the most odious revilings and reproaches of the person and honour of the King that can be imagined, and renouncing all allegiance to him; in whose pockets were found several papers of memorials of his own scurrilous behaviour, in such loose expressions as modest ears cannot endure. The man was the principal governor and incendiary of the rude people of that place against their Sovereign. So full a qualification was a heightened measure of malice and disloyalty for the service that it weighed down the infamy of any other vicious behaviour.

— Clarendon.

Clarendon adds that if it had not been for the death of the Earl of Denbigh he should not "have mentioned an action of so little moment as this of Birmingham". He deplores it, because

of the dismal inequality of the contention in which always some earl or person of great honour or fortune fell when, after a most signal victory over the other side, there was seldom lost a man of any known family, or of other reputation than of passion for the cause in which he fell.

— Clarendon.

The death of the Earl of Denbigh had a greater significance than many other earls because the Earl's son and successor (Basil Fielding) was a strong Parliamentarian, and the death of the Earl meant the transfer of the family influence, which was considerable, from the King to the Parliament

The organs of the Parliament extolled the Birmingham bravery and the Royalist cruelty—their wanton cruelty—in burning houses. The Royalist organs rejoiced at the just judgment which had befallen the disloyal town, and the punishment it had pleased the Lord to inflict on the inhabitants for their rebellious views.

Three accounts of the fight were published. The first of the three was published on 3 April 1643. It is a Parliamentary account, gives their idea of the affair. Its title and introduction is:

True Relation of Prince Rvpert's Barbarous Cruelty against the Towne of Brumingham,

To which place on Monday Apr. 3, 1643, he marcht with 2000 horse and foot, 4 Drakes, and 2 Sakers; where after two houres fight (being twice beaten off by the Townsmen, in all but 140 Musqueteers) he entered, put divers to the Sword, and burnt about 80 Houses to ashes, suffering no man to carry away his goods, or quench the fire, and making no difference between friend or foe; yet by God's providence the greatest losse fell on the malignants of the Town.

And of the Cavaliers were slaine divers chiefe Commanders, and men of great quality, amongst whom was the Earle of Denbigh, the Lord John Stewart: and as themselves report, the Lord Digby.

London: Printed for John Wright in the Old-baily, April 12, 1643. (Note: The report confuses Lord Digby and the Earl of Denbigh. It was Denbigh that the Cavaliers acknowledged as killed. Lord John Stuart(1621–1644), was a son of Esmé Stewart, 3rd Duke of Lennox, as he died a year later this report of his death was premature. (Lords John and Bernard Stuart Archived 7 May 2009 at the Wayback Machine National Gallery))

This pamphlet sets out the grievances of the Parliament against Rupert's action. The pamphlet contains two reports, one signed "R. P.", who, it is usually said, was Robert Porter, the sword-cutler mentioned in the Prelude, whose mill was burnt by the Royalists for his refusal to sell swords to the King. He is said to have known not only how to make, but also how to use, a sword when made, and that he used his own sword with some effect on that 3 April, being one of those troopers of Captain Greaves who took part in that charge against the Royalists towards the close of the fight near Smethwick, in which the Earl of Denbigh was killed. The other account is signed " R. G.", possibly Richard Greaves himself.

The second, date 14 April 1643, is a Royalist pamphlet:

A Letter written from Walshall by a worthy Gentleman to his Friend in Oxford, concerning Burmingham. (Printed in the year 1643. A MS. note adds April 14th.)

It defends Rupert from the load of abuse showered on him for the excesses his men showed during and after the battle. It lays out the charges mentioned by Clarendon, and justifies the killing of the Priest as either bad, or mad and possibly "One of the new Enthusiasts". The pamphlet claims that one or two houses were set on fire during the assault and once completed Rupert ordered the fires extinguished and that any other fires were started by troopers unknown, (against his explicit orders not to do so) after the main body of Cavaliers with Rupert in command left the town.

The third, dated 1 May 1643, is a strong Parliamentary production, possibly the most savage of all:-

Prince Rupert's Burning love of England, discovered in Birmingham's Flames; or, a more Exact and true Naration of Birmingham's Calamities, under the barbarous and inhumane Cruelties of P. Rupert's forces.

Wherein is related how that famous and well affected Town of Birmingham was

Unworthily opposed,	$\Big\}$	$\Big\}$	By Prince Rupert's Forces.
Insolently invaded	$\Big\}$	$\Big\}$	By Prince Rupert's Forces.
Notoriously robbed and plundered,	$\Big\}$	$\Big\}$	By Prince Rupert's Forces.
And most cruelly fired in cold blood the next day.	$\Big\}$	$\Big\}$	By Prince Rupert's Forces.

Together with the Number of Prince Rupert's Forces, his considerable Persons slaine, or mortally wounded; their many abominable Carriages in and after the taking of the Town. The small Strength which Birmingham had to maintaine their defence, the Names of their men slaine; the number of houses burned, and persons thereby destitute of habitation; with divers other considerable passages.

Published at the request of the Committee at Coventry, that the Kingdom may timely take notice what is generally to be expected if the Cavaliers insolencies be not speedily crushed.

A righteous man regardeth the life of hit Beast, but the lender mereies of l/w wicked are cruell.—Prov. xii. 10.

London: Printed for Thomas Vnderhill, 1643. [A MS. Note adds, "1st of May".]

John Bund stated that the titles of these tracts show clearly what the grievances of the Parliament were against Rupert. His defeat of the men of Birmingham was resented, but still more so was his application of the rules of war to unfortified towns. For long after the Parliamentarians never ceased to speak in the strongest terms of the Birmingham Butcheries.
