= Jack Porter =

Jack Porter may refer to:

- Jack Nusan Porter (born 1944), Ukrainian and American writer, sociologist, and activist
- Jack Porter (footballer) (born 2008), English footballer
- Jack Porter (political activist) (1896–1986), Texas businessman and political activist
- Jack Porter, a character in the TV series Revenge
- Jack Porter, a character in Watch Over Me

== See also ==
- John Porter (disambiguation)
