= Bill Porter =

Bill Porter may refer to:

- Bill Porter (sound engineer) (1931–2010), American sound engineer and music pioneer
- Bill Porter (salesman) (1932–2013), American salesman with cerebral palsy
- Bill Porter (author) (born 1943), American author who writes under the name Red Pine
- Bill Porter (golfer) (born 1959), American golfer
- Bill Porter (hurdler) (1926–2000), American track and field hurdler
- Bill Porter (play), a 1925 play by Upton Sinclair

== See also ==
- Billy Porter (disambiguation)
- William Porter (disambiguation)
