= Jono (video game) =

- Developer: Part Time Monkey
- Publisher: Part Time Monkey
- Platform: Windows
- Release: October 5, 2026
- Genre: Platformer
- Mode: Single-player

Jono is a 2026 platform game by Tuomas Erikoinen's one-person studio Part Time Monkey. It has one million levels and only one person can play the game at any point in time, in 60 second intervals, with all other players watching a livestream of the person currently playing.

== Gameplay ==
The player has 60 seconds to complete levels. It is a 2D platformer where the player can jump and double jump, and the developer has described the physics as deterministic. The player faces various obstacles, such as spikes that kill the player or portals that transport the player. If a player completes three levels, they are given cosmetics. Once the 60 seconds are over or if the player has died five times before then, another player takes over from where the last one left off. When they are not the single-player, other players can watch them in a livestream similar to those on the platform Twitch, featuring a chat functionality and emojis. The livestream also has minigames. The levels are either procedurally-generated, with the developer saying that it does not use generative AI, or creations from other players that have been reviewed and approved to appear. There is a secondary mode featuring harder levels created by players.

The game has one million levels. As of November 18, 2026, 21% of the levels have been completed.

== Development ==
Jono was developed and published by Part Time Monkey, the studio of Tuomas Erikoinen, the original artist for Angry Birds. Erikoinen has said that he conceived of the idea of Jono while trying to make "something unique", and that later in the creation process he had been partly inspired by social games. Jono released on October 5, 2026, on Steam. The game is free-to-play and does not contain any monetization. In an interview with GamesRadar+, Erikoinen said that it had taken about a month to create the game. Since being released, Erikoinen has expanded the game.

== Reception ==
Austin Wood of GamesRadar+ said that the game reminded him of Terry Cavanagh's video game VVVVVV. In a Reddit comment, Erikoinen said "the game is the reason players come, and the chat is the reason they stay (I think)". Rebekah Valentine of Kotaku had a similar assessment.
