= Louis Dalton Porter =

American artist (1919-2006)

Louis Dalton Porter (May 17, 1919 – June 28, 2006) was an American artist.

Porter was born in Kaplan, Louisiana. He grew up in Biloxi, Mississippi and Crowley, Louisiana. At the beginning of World War II he went to the Washington, D.C. area to train at Fort Belvoir and Fort Meade. He served as a member of the Ghost Army in World War II. In this role, Porter created "painstakingly realistic" camouflage such as leaves and branches on material the United States Army was trying to conceal from the German Army and purposefully less realistic camouflage on dummy material designed to attract German fire, according to Jack Kneece, author of Ghost Army of World War II.

After the war he settled in Prince George's County. He worked as a sign maker for Hanlein Signs and Porter & Brady Signs. Later he opened Porter Signs where he hand-lettered signs and painted architectural renderings. Porter also applied gold leaf in the National Shrine of the Basilica of the Immaculate Conception in Washington, D.C., and to the domes of several government buildings.

His work includes a five-foot (1.5 meter) painted bluebird sculpture, "The Prince." Prince George's County, Maryland bought "The Prince" in 2003 and presented it as a coronation gift to its "sister city," the Royal Bafokeng Nation of South Africa.

Porter died of a heart attack at his home in Oxon Hill, Maryland at the age of 87.
