= Tokyo Olympics =

Tokyo Olympics may refer to:

- 1940 Summer Olympics, Games of the XII Olympiad, cancelled due to World War II
- 1964 Summer Olympics, Games of the XVIII Olympiad
- 2020 Summer Olympics, Games of the XXXII Olympiad, held in 2021 due to the COVID-19 pandemic

== See also ==
- Tokyo Olympiad, documentary about the 1964 Tokyo Olympics
- Tokyo bid for the 2016 Summer Olympics
- Tokyo Paralympics (disambiguation)
