= P. A. Porter =

American football player

- Class: 1874

Career information
- College: Yale (1872–1873)

Awards and highlights
- National championship (1872)

Peter A. Porter was a college football player for the Yale Bulldogs' early teams. He presided over the meeting in which Princeton, Columbia, and Rutgers adopted the first standardized rules.
