= Woodford Porter =

Woodford Roy Porter (1918–2006) was the first African American to be elected to the Louisville board of education in 1959, and later became president of the University of Louisville Board of Trustees. He was also the first African American member of the YMCA Metropolitan Board, and the first African American on the board of Mid-America Bancorp, the holding company of the Bank of Louisville. The University of Louisville named the Woodford R. Porter Scholarship for him in the 1984, and in September 2010, named the building for College of Education and Human Development in honor of Porter and his wife, Harriett.
