= Johno =

Johno or Johnno may be the name or nickname of:

== People ==
- Johnno Cotterill (born 1987), Australian water polo player
- Johno Johnson (1930–2017), Australian politician
- Johnno Mann (1896–1973), Australian politician
- Johnno Stuntz (1884–1917), Australian rugby league footballer and soldier

== Fictional characters ==
- Johnno, the protagonist of the novel Johnno
- Johnno, a character in the short film Johnno's Dead
- Johnno Brewer
- Johnno Dean
- Captain Johnno

== See also ==
- Johnathon
- Jono (disambiguation)
