= George Hornidge Porter =

Irish surgeon

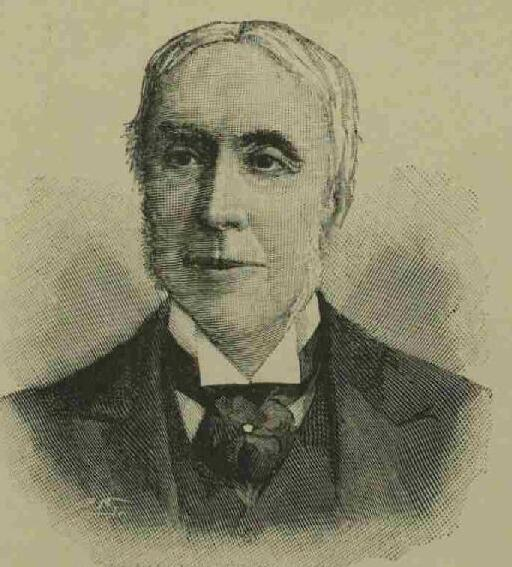
- Born: 24 November 1822; Dublin
- Died: 16 June 1895 (aged 72); Dublin
- Occupation: Surgeon
- Parent(s): William Henry Porter

Sir George Hornidge Porter (24 November 1822 – 15 June 1895) was an Irish surgeon.

== Biography ==
Porter was born in Kildare Street, Dublin, on 24 November 1822, was the only son of William Henry Porter (1790–1861), by his wife Jane (Hornidge) of Blessington, co. Wicklow. The father, son of William Porter of Rathfarnham, co. Dublin, was president of the Irish College of Surgeons in 1838, and professor of surgery in the College of Surgeons school of medicine in Dublin. He was a very popular teacher in the times when the old system was in vogue by which apprenticeship to a well-known surgeon was one of the portals to the profession of surgery. He was also a good anatomist, and made occasional contributions to surgical literature, some of which were of distinct merit. An operation on the femoral artery called Porter's, now, however, rarely practised, owes its name to him. A brother, Frank Thorpe Porter, stipendiary magistrate at Dublin and raconteur, wrote ‘Grand Juries in Ireland,’ Dublin, 1840, and a well-known book of anecdotes, ‘The Recollections of an Irish Police Magistrate’ (2nd edit. 1875).

George Hornidge Porter studied at Trinity College, Dublin, where he graduated M.D. at the College of Surgeons, Ireland. In 1844 he became a fellow of the latter body, and in 1849 was elected surgeon to the Meath Hospital, Dublin, to which institution his father was attached in the same capacity. He early attained the reputation of a bold and successful operator. He contributed to the medical papers, chiefly to the Dublin ‘Journal of Medical Science,’ many records of surgical cases and operations. He was a man of popular manner, and ambitious of social distinction, and was for many years one of the best known men in his native city. He was president of the College of Surgeons of Ireland during 1868–9, and for a long time a member of the council of that college, where he exercised great personal influence. In 1869 he was appointed surgeon-in-ordinary to the queen in Ireland. He was knighted in 1883, and received a baronetcy in 1889 in recognition of his distinguished professional position. The university of Dublin conferred upon him in 1873 the honorary degree of master of surgery, and in 1891 the post of regius professor of surgery. The university of Glasgow gave him in 1888 the honorary degree of LL.D. In his earlier years he frequently gave expert evidence in the coroner's court, and in 1882 he was one of those who were called upon to examine the bodies of Lord Frederick Cavendish and Thomas Henry Burke, who were murdered in the Phœnix Park. Sir George Porter was attached to many of the Dublin hospitals in an honorary or consulting capacity, and was an active member of numerous charitable and other boards. He acquired by purchase landed property in co. Wexford, and was proud of his position as a country gentleman, and especially of being high sheriff of the county. He died of heart-disease at his residence, Merrion Square, Dublin, on 15 June 1895.

He married Julia, daughter of Isaac Bond of Flimby, Cumberland, by whom he had one son.

== Arms ==
Coat of arms of George Hornidge Porter
Notes Granted by Sir John Bernard Burke, Ulster King of Arms, on 6 July 1887. Crest In front of two cross crosslets fitchee saltireways Or a cherub Proper. Escutcheon Sable on a fess Or between three church bells Argent a trefoil slipped Proper between two annulets Gules. Motto Fear God Honor The King

== See also ==
- Porter baronets
