= Mark Porter (writer) =

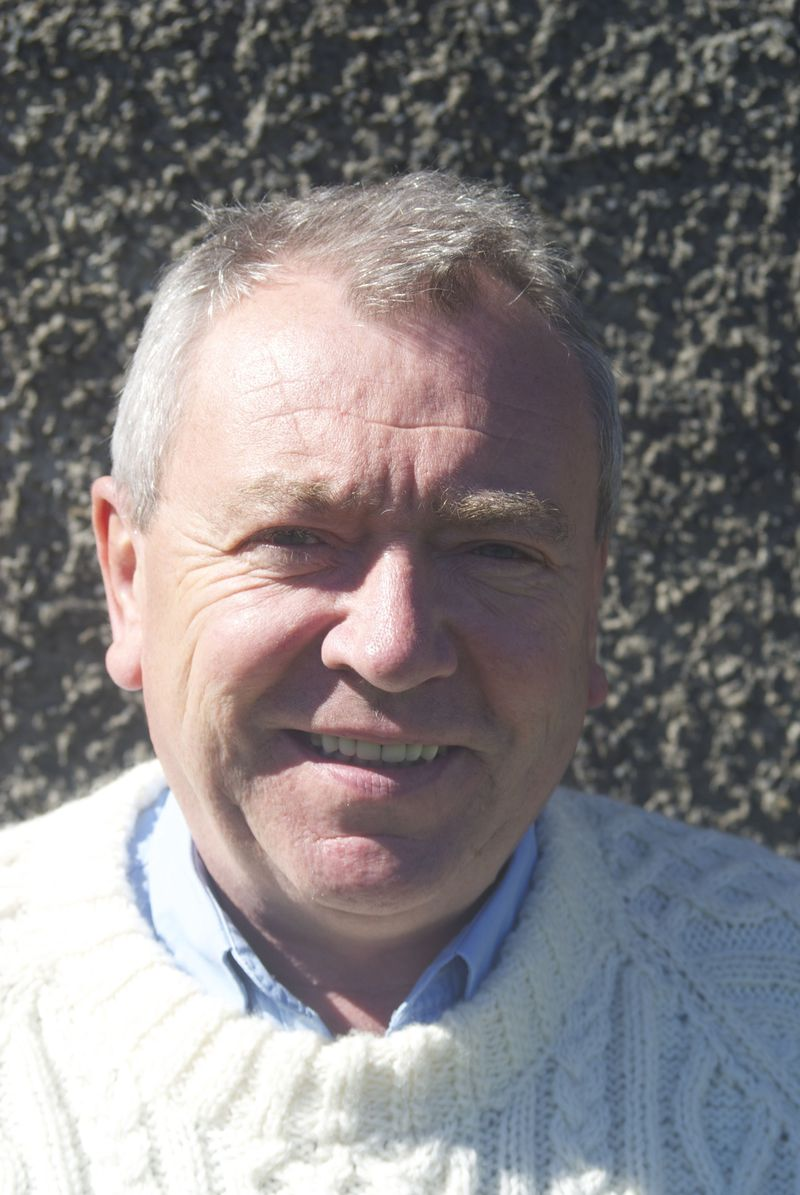
- Mark Porter (b. 16 December 1960) is a Walsall-born, French based author and publisher.
- Born: 16 December 1960 (age 65); Walsall, England
- Website: www.cycle-guides.co.uk

Mark Porter (born 16 December 1960) is a Walsall-born France-based travel writer and publisher.

Porter is the author of Coast to Coast Cycle Routes (ISBN 9780955508264), a guide book to three of Britain's most popular cycle routes, all of which travel through the Lake District and Northern England, now in its 16th edition. He also wrote Grand Tour, a guide to Paris, Rome, London, Edinburgh, Dublin and Cardiff for followers of the Six Nations rugby championships (ISBN 9780954482763), and Tartan Army Tour Guide to Europe (ISBN 0954482778) for Scottish football fans.

A former features editor of the Sunday Express after a colourful 'career' in Fleet St, Porter is a freelance contributor to the Daily Mail, Newsweek, Standpoint, The Guardian, The Herald of Glasgow, and Cycle he now writes regularly for the French political magazine, Causeur. A regular visitor to the Scottish Borders, Porter's travel column appears in the Herald's weekend magazine.

He is also a food writer (ten years as a Contributing Editor and Pudding Correspondent of Waitrose Food Illustrated) and has been a restaurant inspector for the Good Food Guide since 2011. He also runs several cycling websites. Porter spends his time between Scotland and France and has set up VeriTable, a new website designed to select the good restaurants from the bad in France, a nation whose culinary standing is increasingly being questioned.
