= Henry Porter (cricketer) =

English cricketer

Henry James Porter (c. 1810 – 19 December 1878) was an English first-class cricketer active 1842–43 who played for Nottinghamshire. He was born in Nottingham and died in Sheffield. He played in three first-class matches.
