= Henry Porter (younger) =

Henry Porter (born ca. 1636) was an English politician who sat in the House of Commons in 1659.

Porter was the eldest son of Henry Porter of Lancaster. In 1659, he was elected Member of Parliament for Lancaster in the Third Protectorate Parliament.

Porter was given as aged 29 in 1665.

Parliament of England
Preceded by Henry Porter sen.	Member of Parliament for Lancaster; 1659; With: William West	Succeeded by Thomas Fell
