= Robert Porter (Australian footballer) =

Australian rules footballer

Personal information
- Full name: Robert Graham Porter
- Born: 13 August 1942
- Died: 25 December 2023 (aged 81)
- Original team: Officer
- Height: 177 cm (5 ft 10 in)
- Weight: 74 kg (163 lb)

Playing career^{1}
Years	Club	Games (Goals)
1962	Hawthorn	6 (1)
- ^{1} Playing statistics correct to the end of 1962.

Robert Graham Porter (13 August 1942 – 25 December 2023) was an Australian rules footballer who played with Hawthorn in the Victorian Football League (VFL).
