= Robert W. Porter (neurosurgeon) =

American neurosurgeon (1926–2021)

- Born: Robert W. Porter; December 18, 1926; San Diego, California, U.S.
- Died: June 9, 2021 (aged 94); Marin City, California, U.S.
- Education: Northwestern University; University of California, Los Angeles
- Occupation: Neurosurgeon
- Spouse: Aubrey Dean Mason
- Children: 1

Robert Porter (December 18 1926 – June 9, 2021) was a neurosurgeon in California, United States, and a founding member of the Brain Research Institute who became Professor of Neurological Surgery at the University of California, Irvine, College of Medicine in 1969, then Professor Emeritus.

== Education ==
Porter studied at Northwestern University, taking a B.S. in 1946, a M.S. in 1948, and a M.D. in 1950. He did an internship at the Los Angeles County General Hospital. Next he had a fellowship in neuroscience at the University of California, Los Angeles. In 1952, he earned a Ph.D. from Northwestern University. That was followed by residency training in neurological surgery at the Veterans Administration Hospital in Long Beach, California.

== Career ==
For two years Porter was in the U.S. Army, performing neurosurgical investigations at the Walter Reed Army Institute of Research. In 1958 he became Chief of the Neurosurgical Service and Director of Research at the VA Hospital. He joined the faculty of the UCLA School of Medicine, having appointments in both anatomy and neurological surgery. In 1963 he was a lecturer and visiting neurosurgeon in the Department of Surgical Neurology at the University of Edinburgh, developing clinical and research techniques in stereotac performing surgery.

Porter's research has concerned the integration of central autonomic function and the interrelationships between the brain stem and abnormal visceral function. His clinical neurosurgical interests have been in spinal cord injury and functional stereotaxy.

Porter has 120 publications in his bibliography.

== Personal life ==
Porter was married to Aubrey Dean Porter on June 30, 1968. They met at a blind dinner date. They had one son, Tony, and two grandchildren. His wife said he was a gifted pianist, giving his first recital at age 5, participating in competitions when he was 12, and performing in piano concerts all the way up to Medical School; Once he retired, he played the organ or piano daily.

== Death ==
Porter died from a heart attack on June 9, 2021, in Marin, California.

== Memberships ==
Porter was a member of the American Medical Association, American College of Surgeons, American Association of Neurological Surgeons, American Academy of Neurological Surgery, Research Society of Neurological Surgeons, Western Neurosurgical Society (President, 1971), California Association of Neurological Surgeons, Southern California Neurosurgical Society (President, 1967), American Physiological Society and American Association of Anatomists.

== Publications ==
- Porter, R. W. (1995). Back injury and litigation. Oxford, UK Herndon, VA: BIOS Scientific Publishers Distributors, USA and Canada, Books International. ISBN 978-1-85996-110-0. OCLC 34284264.
- Porter, R. W. (1983). Understanding back pain (in German). Edinburgh New York: Churchill Livingstone. ISBN 978-0-443-02711-6. OCLC 8866642.
- Porter, R. W. (1993). Management of back pain. Edinburgh New York: Churchill Livingstone. ISBN 978-0-443-04630-8. OCLC 28967988.
- Aspden, R. M. (1995). Lumbar spine disorders : current concepts (in Italian). Singapore New Jersey: World Scientific. ISBN 978-981-02-2175-1. OCLC 31866910.
- "The spine and medical negligence" (PDF). CRC Press.
- Porter, Robert W.; Pazo, Jorge H.; Dillard, George V. (1971). "Triphasic brain stem response to detrusor contraction". Brain Research. 35 (1). Elsevier BV: 119–126. doi:10.1016/0006-8993(71)90598-1. ISSN 0006-8993. PMID 5134221.
- Porter, Robert W. (1967). "A pallidal response to detrusor contraction". Brain Research. 4 (4). Elsevier BV: 381–383. doi:10.1016/0006-8993(67)90169-2. ISSN 0006-8993. PMID 6033809.
- Lewin, Richard J.; Dillard, George V.; Porter, Robert W. (1967). "Extrapyramidal inhibition of the urinary bladder". Brain Research. 4 (4). Elsevier BV: 301–307. doi:10.1016/0006-8993(67)90160-6. ISSN 0006-8993. PMID 6033802.
