= Thomas Porter (Wisconsin politician) =

American politician

Thomas Porter was an Irish-born American politician. He was a member of the Wisconsin State Assembly.

He was born in what was then County Tyrone, Ireland. During the American Civil War, he served with the 30th Wisconsin Volunteer Infantry Regiment of the Union Army.

== Political career ==
Porter was a member of the Assembly in 1885. Additionally, he was an alderman of Hudson, Wisconsin and a member of the county board of St. Croix County, Wisconsin. He was a Republican.
