= Robert Porter (economist) =

American economist (born 1955)

Robert H. Porter
- Born: 1955 (age 70–71)

Academic background
- Education: University of Western Ontario (BA); Princeton University (PhD)
- Doctoral advisor: Richard E. Quandt

Academic work
- Discipline: Industrial organization, auction theory
- Institutions: Northwestern University

Robert Hugh Porter (born 1955) is an American economist and William R. Kenan Jr. Professor of economics at Northwestern University. His research focuses on industrial organisation and auctions.

== Education ==
Porter received his undergraduate degree from the University of Western Ontario's Department of Mathematics and Economics in 1976. He went on to further study at Princeton University, which granted him a Ph.D. in economics in 1981.

== Career ==
Upon graduating from Princeton University, Porter worked as an assistant professor at the University of Minnesota, followed by a brief stint as an associate professor at Stony Brook University. He became professor at Northwestern University in 1987 and was department chair from 2004 to 2007 and from 2022 to 2025.

Porter was elected fellow of the Econometric Society in 1989 and served as its president in 2015. The American Academy of Arts and Sciences made him fellow in 1997. He is a fellow of the Game Theory Society.

He has served as editor and coeditor of various economic journals, such as The RAND Journal of Economics, Econometrica and The Review of Economic Studies.

In 2018, he was awarded (jointly with Ariel Pakes and Tim Bresnahan) the BBVA Foundation Frontiers of Knowledge Award in the Economics, Finance and Management category.
