= Thomas Porter (cardiologist) =

American cardiologist

- Occupation: Cardiologist
- Known for: Theodore F. Hubbard Distinguished Chair of Cardiology and professor of medicine at the University of Nebraska Medical Center

Thomas R. Porter is an American cardiologist. He holds the Theodore F. Hubbard Distinguished Chair of Cardiology at the University of Nebraska Medical Center.

Porter obtained his Doctor of Medicine degree from the University of Nebraska Medical Center in 1984 and was a resident and fellow at the Medical College of Virginia. The Web of Science lists more than 100 publications in peer-reviewed medical journals, which have been cited over 4000 times, giving him an h-index of 34.
