= William Henry Porter (surgeon) =

Irish surgeon (1790–1861)

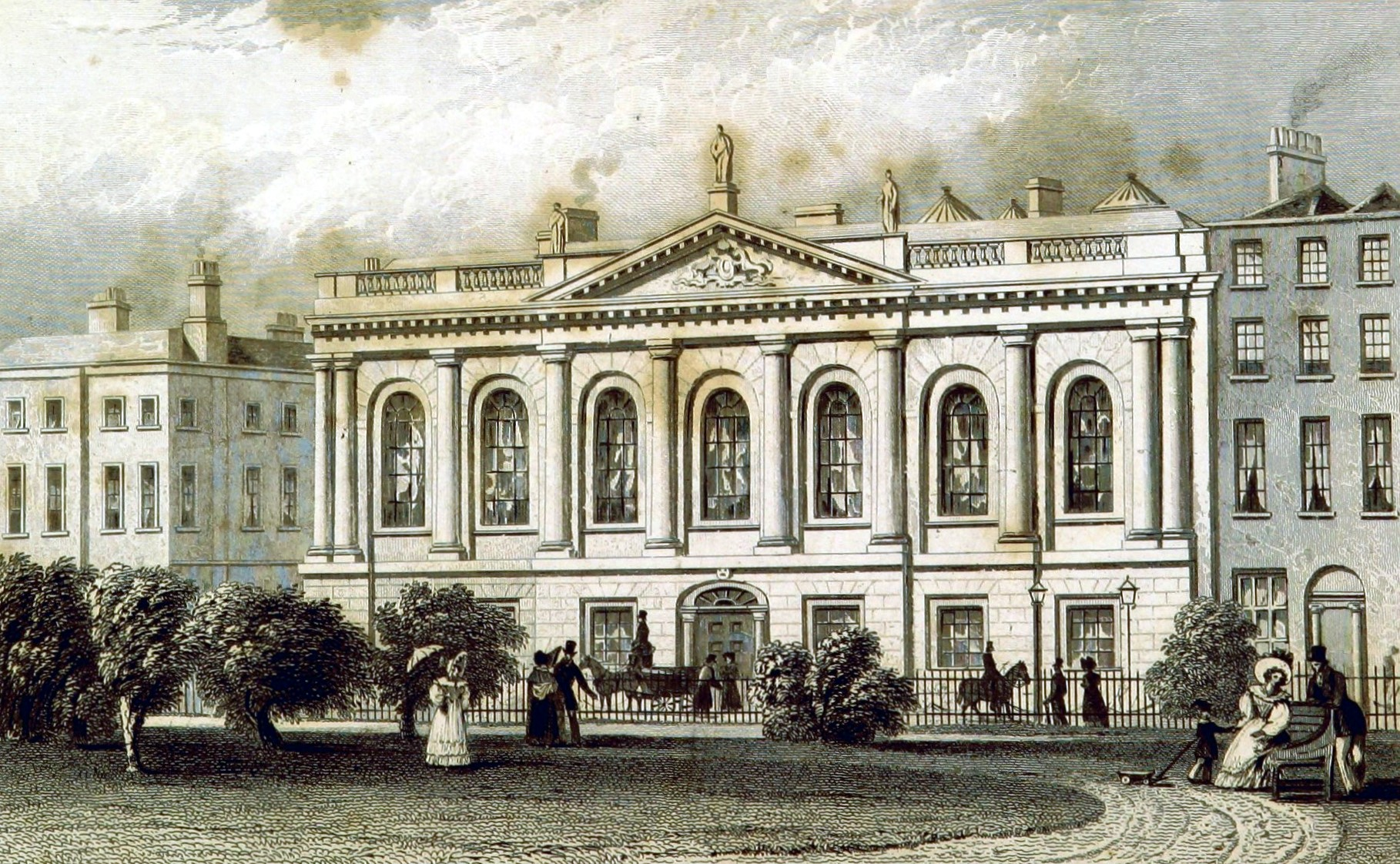
"The College of Surgeons, Dublin". 1837.

William Henry Porter (5 March 1790 – 27 April 1861) was President of the Royal College of Surgeons in Ireland (RCSI) in 1838. He was noted for his writing on the larynx and the trachea.

Porter graduated in arts from Trinity College Dublin in 1810. In January 1809, he was indentured to Sir Philip Crampton and his studies continued in the RCSI medical school and the Meath Hospital. On 13 September 1814, he obtained the Letters Testimonial of the college, and on 10 November 1817, was elected a Member. In 1826 he became connected, as a teacher of anatomy and surgery, with the Park-street School of Medicine, and in 1837 he was elected Professor of Surgery to the Royal College of Surgeons in Ireland. He was Surgeon at the Meath Hospital and Consulting Surgeon at the City of Dublin Hospital.

His son, Sir George Hornidge Porter, was also a surgeon.

== Selected publications ==
- "A Successful Case of Cynanache Maligna, with Trachaeotomy", Medico-Chirurgical Transactions, 1821.
- Observations on the surgical pathology of the larynx and trachea. 1826.
- "Cases of Ligature of Subclavian and Right Carotid, and a Case of Tracheotomy", Dublin Hospital Reports, 1830.

== See also ==
- List of presidents of the Royal College of Surgeons in Ireland
