= Robert Porter (sword-cutler) =

Robert Porter (after 1603–1648) was a sword-cutler in Birmingham who supported the Parliamentary cause in the English Civil War.

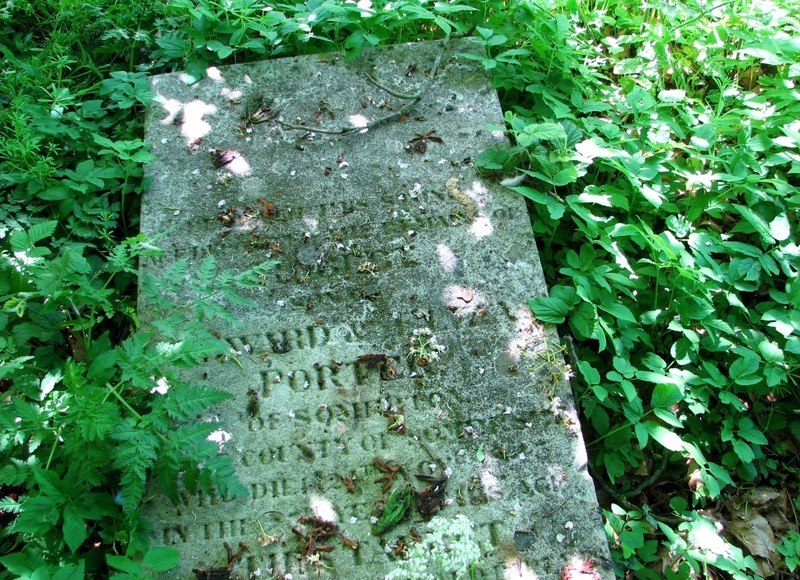
The grave of Robert Porter.

== Biography ==
Robert Porter was the third son of Henry Porter (died c. 1619) and Anne, daughter of William Colmore, of New Hall, Birmingham. (Note: The grandfather of Robert Porter was Thomas Porter who is mentioned in the Visitation of Warwickshire in 1619 as "of Edgbaston" married in Alvechurch in 1562, and was buried there in 1591, when the register distinguishes him as "gent.". His eldest son was Henry Porter who was also listed as "of Edgbaston" in the visitation. He was buried there in 1619 or 1620, and it is thought that he also owned property at Alvchurch, as well as at Kings Norton and Birmingham. In 1594 Henry married Anne, daughter of William Colmore, of New Hall, Birmingham, and Anne, daughter of William Fynney, of Cannock, in Staffordshire. This was a good marriage for Henry as the Colmore's were a leading family in Birmingham, but as one of eight daughters and a brother her dowry and inheritance was probably quite small. They had four sons (William, Thomas, Robert and Henry); and three daughters, Sarah, Joan, and Anne (Reade 1909, pp. 15–16).)

At the start of the Civil War started Porter owned a water mill called Town Mill in Digbeth Street, Birmingham. It was located on a stream below Malt, or Moat, Mill which was fed by waters from the moat of the manor house of Birmingham and then flowed into the River Rea. Porter had converted Town Mill from a corn mill into a blade mill, and being, like his brother-in-law, Waldive Willington (Governor of Tamworth Castle), (Note: Robert Porter's sister Joan married Waldive Willington, squire of Hurley Hall, in the parish of Kingsbury, who as Governor of Tamworth Castle held it for Parliament during the First Civil War (Reade 1909, p. 16).) a keen supporter of the Parliamentary cause would only supply swords to the Parliamentary side.

In 1642, before the Battle of Edgehill the first pitched battle of the Civil War, Birmingham supplied the Parliamentary army of Robert Devereux, Earl of Essex with about 15,000 sword blades, many of which probably came from Porter's blade mill, because when Prince Rupert briefly held Birmingham after the Battle of Camp Hill (3 April 1643), Porter's Mill was singled out and burnt down by local Royalists ("malignants" as they were described by supporters of Parliament) to prevent it supplying further blades to the Parliamentary armies. (Note: In the letter Porter wrote describing Prince Rupert's attack on the town in 1643 (which Porter helped to repulse) he mention of the fact that "the malignamt are so enraged they have pulled down my Mill and threaten to pull done my house ad divers others" (Reade 1909, p. 17).)

Porter not only made blades, but knew how to use them. He was a captain in the Parliamentary cavalry during the Battle of Camp Hill, and is reputed to be the author of a letter published in a propaganda pamphlet by the Parliamentary side (see A True Relation of Prince Rvpert's Barbarous Cruelly against the Towne of Brumingham). Later in the Civil War he was treasurer of the Parliamentary garrison of Edgbaston Hall under the command of "Tinker" Fox.

Porter was a trustee of Field's Charity and the Lench's Trust in Birmingham. He died in 1648.

== Family ==
Porter's two sons Josiah and Samual, both continued as sword-cutlers, or "long-cutlers" as they were sometimes called. Samuel who lived at New Hall, dabbled in coal mines, without benefit to himself of his relatives.
