= Robert Porter (English footballer) =

English footballer

Personal information
- Full name: Robert Porter
- Place of birth: England
- Position: Forward

Senior career*
Years	Team	Apps	(Gls)
1888–1889	Blackburn Rovers	1	(0)
- * Club domestic league appearances and goals

Robert Porter was an English footballer who played in The Football League for Blackburn Rovers.

Robert Porter made one appearance for Blackburn Rovers in The Football League. He came into the Rovers team on 27 October 1888 at Leamington Road, Blackburn, the then home of Blackburn Rovers for their match with Stoke. According to the press reports of the time (as quoted in the Metcalf book) the match was of poor quality with many mistakes but Rovers overwhelmed Stoke in a 5–2 victory. In the match reports Porter' performance wasn't mentioned. Porter never played League football again and his history after this match was not recorded.
