= Bob Porter (footballer) =

Australian rules footballer

Personal information
- Full name: Bob Porter
- Born: 16 September 1943 (age 83)
- Height: 178 cm (5 ft 10 in)
- Weight: 73 kg (161 lb)

Playing career^{1}
Years	Club	Games (Goals)
1962–64	South Melbourne	21 (12)
- ^{1} Playing statistics correct to the end of 1964.

Bob Porter (born 16 September 1942) is a former Australian rules footballer who played with South Melbourne in the Victorian Football League (VFL).
