= Henry Porter (MP) =

English politician

Henry Porter (born ca. 1613) was an English politician who sat in the House of Commons in 1654 and 1656.

Porter was the eldest son of James Porter of Lancaster. He was a major in the service of the commonwealth. In 1654, he was elected Member of Parliament for Lancaster in the First Protectorate Parliament. He was re-elected MP for Lancaster in 1656 to the Second Protectorate Parliament

Porter was given as aged 52 in 1665.

Porter had a son Henry who was also MP for Lancaster.

Parliament of England
Preceded by Not represented in Barebones Parliament	Member of Parliament for Lancaster; 1654–1656	Succeeded by Henry Porter jun. William West
