= Henry Rinaldo Porter =

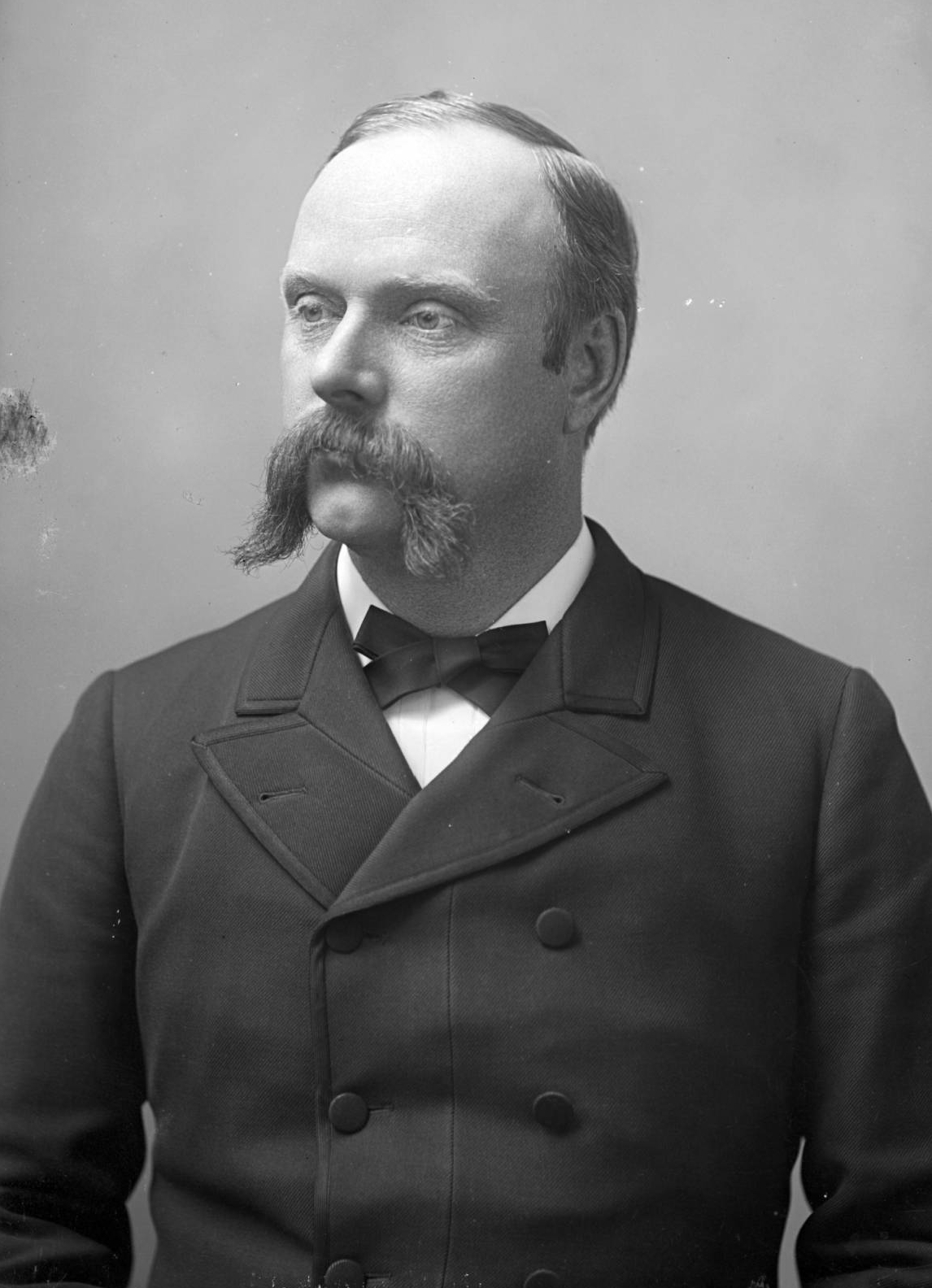
Henry Rinaldo Porter studio portrait.

Henry Rinaldo Porter (February 13, 1848 – March 3, 1903) was a Surgeon in the 7th U.S. Cavalry at the Battle of the Little Big Horn.

== Early life ==
Porter was born in Lee Center, New York. He graduated Georgetown University School of Medicine in 1872 and interned for three months at Columbia Hospital for Women, Washington, DC.

== Military career ==
He signed on in 1872 as an army contract surgeon for duty in the Arizona Territory under General George Crook where he was cited for bravery. In 1873, he was assigned as a contract Surgeon with the army at Camp Hancock in Bismarck, Dakota Territory. In 1876 he joined Lieutenant Colonel George Armstrong Custer who assigned Dr. Porter to Frederick Benteen's battalion during the march to the Little Bighorn River from May to June 1876 and to Major Reno's at the Battle of Little Bighorn. Porter was the only one of the 7th Cavalry's three surgeons available to the survivors on Reno Hill for the two days they were besieged. (Dr. George Edwin Lord had been killed with Custer's Battalion (Yates' Troops E and F) and Dr. James Madison DeWolf was killed during the climb up Reno Hill.) Porter attended the wounded on the deck of the Far West, which brought them back to Fort Abraham Lincoln after the battle.

Dr. Porter left his contract service in December 1876. He testified at the Reno Court of Inquiry in 1879.

== Death ==
Porter died in 1903 in Agra, India, where he had gone on a trip around the world. His wife, Charlotte Viets of Oberlin, Ohio, died August 6, 1888, and is buried in Oberlin. A memorial for Porter is located next to Viets grave, but Porter is buried at the Cantonment Cemetery in Agra, India. There is currently a street in New York Mills, NY, where he lived as a youth, named in his honor and a street in Bismarck, North Dakota, also named for him.
