= Billy Porter (Australian footballer) =

Australian rules footballer

Personal information
- Full name: Billy Porter
- Born: 25 July 1875
- Died: 16 March 1910 (aged 34)

Playing career^{1}
Years	Club	Games (Goals)
1898	St Kilda	3 (0)
- ^{1} Playing statistics correct to the end of 1898.

Billy Porter (25 July 1875 – 16 March 1910) was an Australian rules footballer who played with St Kilda in the Victorian Football League (VFL).
