= Jono Porter =

Australian freestyle motocross rider (1981–2004)

Jonothan Douglas Porter (12 May 1981 – 9 June 2004) was an Australian freestyle motocross rider. He was born in Biloela, Queensland, and grew up in Gladstone.

Porter was a factory Suzuki Australia rider and formed his motocross team and company, JPI Industries. In 1994, he won the Australian 80cc Australian MX Championship. In 2002, he won the Australian X Games, the Melbourne Supercross Masters, and the 2002 Planet X Games; in the last, he performed the first flip in Australian competition.

On 6 June 2004, while leading the pack at the Maxxis Australian Motocross Champions in Coolum, Porter crashed and was run over by the riders behind him. He died from his injuries three days later at Nambour Hospital, aged 23.

== Sources ==
- Not forgotten - Jono Porter
- Motocross champ Porter dies after crash
- Gympie Times
  - Jono Porter Memorial to begin its final lap
  - Motocross idol Jono Porter remembered with memorial weekend
  - Jono Porter remembered
  - Gladstone ready to fly for Porter
- Jono Porter Memorial Motorcross Award in Engraved Stainless and Printed Acrylic
- Ready to ride at Jono Porter Memorial
