= Thomas Porter (MP) =

Member of the Parliament of England

Thomas Porter (by 1482 – 22 March 1522) was an English politician from Gloucester.

He was appointed sheriff of Gloucester for 1503–04 and 1509–10, mayor for 1511–12, and an alderman from 1516 to his death. He was a member (MP) of the parliament of England for Gloucester in 1515.
