= Charles Talbot Porter =

American lawyer, engineer, and inventor

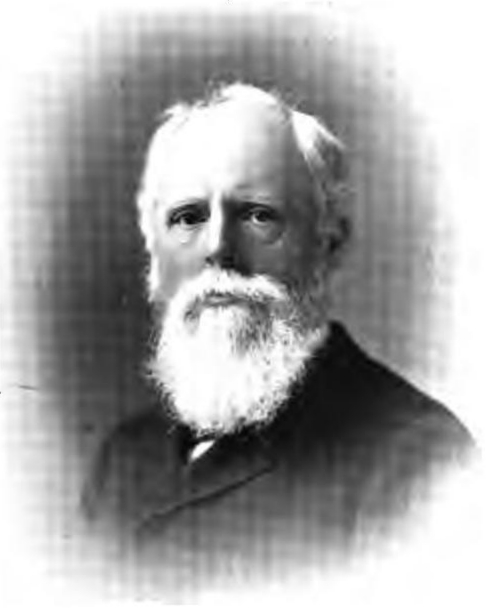
- Charles Talbot Porter (1826-1910)
- Born: January 18, 1826; Auburn, New York
- Died: August 28, 1910 (aged 84)
- Occupations: Lawyer, engineer, inventor
- Known for: Invented the high-speed steam engine

Charles Talbot Porter (January 18, 1826 – August 28, 1910) was an American lawyer, engineer, and inventor of mechanical devices, particularly the Porter-Allen high speed steam engine.

Born in Auburn, New York, Porter was the son of the John Porter, a lawyer and politician. He obtained his law degree from Hamilton College in 1845, started his career as lawyer, and grew out to be one of the foremost of modern American engineers of his days.

Porter was elected an honorary member of the American Society of Mechanical Engineers in 1890. He was recipient of the 1909 John Fritz Medal.

== Selected publications ==
- Charles Talbot Porter. Description of Richards' improved steam-engine indicator
- Porter, Charles T. A treatise on the Richards steam-engine indicator, with directions for its use, New York, D. Van Nostrand, 1883.
- Charles Talbot Porter. Description of the Porter-Allen steam engine as made by the Southwark Foundry and Machine Co., Philadelphia. C.C. Chalfant, printer, 1885.
- Porter, Charles T. Engineering Reminiscences contributed to "Power" and "American machinist". New York, J. Wiley, 1910.

Works about Charles Talbot Porter

- Mayr, Otto. "„Von Charles Talbot Porter zu Johann Friedrich Radinger: Die Anfänge der schnelllaufenden Dampfmaschine und der Maschinendynamik”." Technikgeschichte 40.1 (1973): 1-32.
- Mayr, Otto. "Yankee practice and engineering theory: Charles T. Porter and the dynamics of the high-speed steam engine." Technology and culture (1975): 570-602.
