= John Porter (footballer, born 1886) =

English footballer

Personal information
- Date of birth: 1886
- Place of birth: Stockton, England
- Height: 5 ft 8 in (1.73 m)
- Position: Centre-half

Senior career*
Years	Team	Apps	(Gls)
1908–1909	Skinningrove		
1909–1910	Grimsby Town	1	(0)
- * Club domestic league appearances and goals

John Porter (1886 – after 1909) was an English professional footballer who played as a centre-half.
