= Henry Martyn Porter =

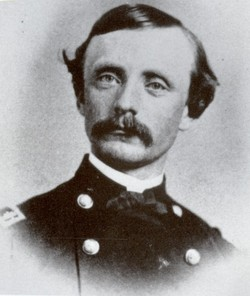
- Henry Martyn Porter
- Born: April 25, 1835
- Died: February 6, 1907 (aged 71)
- Burial place: West Cemetery, Middlebury, Vermont
- Military career
- Allegiance: United States of America; Union
- Branch: United States Army; Union Army
- Service years: 1861–1865
- Rank: Colonel
- Unit: 7th Vermont Infantry
- Conflicts: American Civil War

Henry Martyn Porter (April 25, 1835 – February 6, 1907) was an American Civil War Union Army Officer who served as a colonel and commander of the 7th Vermont Infantry. He graduated in 1857 from Middlebury College in Middlebury, Vermont. He then became a teacher; first in Sutherland Falls, Vermont in 1857, then in Rupert, Vermont, from 1858 to 1859, then in New York City, also in 1859. He enlisted in the U.S. Army in 1861 as a private in the New York National Guard. He later became a captain with the Vermont Infantry and achieved the rank of colonel.

From 1863 to 1864, he was the provost marshal for the city of New Orleans. He served for five years until 1865.

After his military career, he headed a department for the American Bank Note Company for over 22 years. he was a member of the Loyal Legion, Lotus Club, Lawyer's Club, and the Union League Club. He died at the age of 71, and is interred at West Cemetery in Middlebury, Vermont.
