= John Porter (New York politician) =

American politician

John Porter (October 24, 1790 Hadley, Hampshire County, Massachusetts – February 3, 1874 Auburn, Cayuga County, New York) was an American politician from New York.

== Life ==
He graduated from Williams College in 1810. He then studied law in Albany, New York, was admitted to the bar in 1815, and commenced practice in Auburn. He served as District Attorney of Cayuga County from 1821 to 1828. In 1825, he married Abigail M. Phillips (1800–1886), a niece of Congressman Gurdon S. Mumford (1764–1831), and they had five children. He was Surrogate of Cayuga County from 1828 to 1836.

He was a member of the New York State Senate (6th D.) from 1843 to 1846, sitting in the 66th, 67th, 68th and 69th New York State Legislatures.

He was buried at the Fort Hill Cemetery in Auburn.

His son Charles Talbot Porter (1826–1910) was an inventor of mechanical devices, and received the John Fritz Medal in 1909. His daughter Anna Phillips Porter (1828–1910) was married to Alonzo Glover Beardsley (1820–1906), son of State Senator John Beardsley (1783–1857).

== Sources ==
- The New York Civil List compiled by Franklin Benjamin Hough (pages 134f, 144, 371 and 412; Weed, Parsons and Co., 1858)
- History of Western Massachusetts by Josiah Gilbert Holand (Springfield MA, 1855; Vol. II, pg.226)
- Williams Biographical Annals by Calvin Durfee (1871; pg. 313f)
- Beardsley genealogy

New York State Senate
| Preceded by Robert C. Nicholas | New York State Senate; Seventh District (Class 4); 1843–1846 | Succeeded by Abraham Gridley |
