= Robert Porter (British Army officer) =

Major-General Sir Robert Porter KCB CMG
- Born: 31 January 1858; County Donegal, Ireland
- Died: 27 February 1928 (aged 70)
- Military career
- Allegiance: United Kingdom
- Branch: British Army
- Service years: 1881–1918
- Rank: Major-General
- Unit: Royal Army Medical Corps
- Conflicts: Fourth Anglo-Ashanti War; Second Boer War; First World War
- Awards: Knight Commander of the Order of the Bath; Companion of the Order of St Michael and St George; Mentioned in Despatches (6); Commander of the Order of the Crown (Belgium); Croix de Guerre (Belgium)

Major-General Sir Robert Porter KCB CMG (31 January 1858 – 27 February 1928) was a British Army officer and physician.

== Early life and career ==
Porter was born in County Donegal, Ireland, the son of Andrew Porter. He was educated at Foyle College, Derry, and the University of Glasgow, from which he graduated Bachelor of Medicine (MB). He was commissioned a surgeon in the Army Medical Department (later the Royal Army Medical Corps) on 5 February 1881. He was promoted surgeon-major on 5 February 1893. He served in the Fourth Anglo-Ashanti War of 1895–1896 and the Second Boer War of 1899–1902, returning from South Africa on the SS Kinfauns Castle in December 1902. He was promoted lieutenant-colonel while in South Africa on 4 February 1901, and colonel on 14 January 1910. He was placed on half-pay on 14 January 1914, but was restored to the establishment on 5 August 1914, the day after the outbreak of the First World War.

== First World War ==
During the First World War, Porter was mentioned in despatches six times. He was promoted to the temporary rank of surgeon-general on 2 November 1914, and from 1915 to 1917 he served as director of medical services of the Second Army. He was appointed a Companion of the Order of the Bath in the 1916 Birthday Honours. Belgium also appointed him Commander of the Order of the Crown in 1916 and awarded him the Croix de Guerre in 1918, as he had spent much of his wartime service in Belgium and had been responsible for dealing with the 1914–1915 civilian typhoid epidemic in the Second Army area. He retired on 31 January 1918. The rank of surgeon-general was redesignated major-general later in 1918. He was appointed Companion of the Order of St Michael and St George (CMG) in the 1919 Birthday Honours and Knight Commander of the Order of the Bath (KCB) in the 1921 New Year Honours.

== Personal life ==
Porter married Mary Phillipa Johnstone in 1903; they had three sons. From August to December 1926, he led a party of schoolboys on a tour of Australia. He died from pneumonia and pleurisy at his home at 27 The Avenue, Beckenham, Kent, at the age of 70.
