= Charlie Porter (trumpeter) =

American trumpeter and composer

- Born: Charles William Porter
- Genres: Jazz, classical
- Occupations: Musician, bandleader, composer, Music educator
- Instrument: Trumpet
- Years active: 1996-present
- Labels: Origin Records, PHP Records
- Website: Official website

Charles William Porter (born May 10, 1978) known professionally as Charlie Porter is an American trumpeter, composer and music educator based in Portland, Oregon. Porter has been awarded a Grammy Award at the 62nd Annual Grammy Awards for his collaboration on the album Songplay, in 2020. He has recorded many albums as a side musician, and has released two albums as a leader.

== Biography ==
Charlie Porter was born in Boynton Beach, Florida. He studied trumpet at the Dreyfoos School of the Arts, The Juilliard School, Manhattan School of Music and was a Fulbright Scholar at the Paris Conservatory, conservatoire à rayonnement régional de Paris. His mentors include Wynton Marsalis, Mark Gould, Raymond Mase, Guy Touvron, and Laurie Frink.

== Career ==
Porter started in the New York jazz scene in the 1990s while studying classical music under the trumpeter and composer Wynton Marsalis at the Juilliard School. He is a long-standing member of the Absolute Ensemble, directed by Kristjan Järvi, with which he has recorded nine albums, one of which Absolution was nominated for a Grammy Award in 2002, and another Mix, Bach Reinvented which won the coveted German Critics Award in 2000. Porter is currently known to be a frequent member of several ensembles, including the Charlie Porter Quintet, The Alan Jones Sextet and the Chuck Israels Jazz Orchestra. He has toured as both a band-leader and a side-man as both a jazz and classical musician, as well as acting in the soloist and chamber music scene. Porter was the first musician to ever be awarded 1st Prize in the National Trumpet Competition in both Jazz and Classical and he reached the semi-final round in the Thelonious Monk International Jazz Trumpet Competition hosted in Los Angeles. In 2005, as a composer, Porter was the recipient of Chamber Music America and The Doris Duke Foundation's New Works commissioning grant in 2005. As a bandleader, he released his debut self-titled album, Charlie Porter, in 2018 under PHP Records, and Immigration Nation in 2019 under Origin Records, to critical acclaim in major publications, including DownBeat and Jazziz. Porter currently is an adjunct professor of jazz trumpet at Portland State University.

== Discography ==
=== As leader ===
- Charlie Porter (PHP, 2018)
- Immigration Nation (Origin, 2019)
- Cipher (PHP, 2025)

=== As sideman ===
With Philip Glass

- Kundun: Music from the Original Soundtrack (Nonesuch, 1997)
- Aguas Da Amazonia (Orange Mountain, 2017)

With Absolute Ensemble

- Chamber Symphonies: Adams, Schoenberg (CCn'C, 1999)
- Absolute Mix (CCn’C, 2000)
- Absolution (Enja, 2000)
- Absolute Fix (Enja Nova, 2002)
- Absolute Zappa (2007)
- Absolute Zawinul (Intuition, 2009)
- Arabian Nights: Live at Town Hall NYC (Enja, 2011)
- Bach Re-Invented (Sony Classical, 2013)

With Paquito D'Rivera

- Habanera (Enja, 2000)

With Tristan Murail

- Winter Fragments (æon, 2006 )

With Billy Martin

- Starlings (Tzadik, 2006)

With Anthony Coleman

- Pushy Blueness (Tzadik, 2006)

With Russ Spiegel

- Transplants (Ruzztone, 2009)

With Majid Khaliq

- The Basilisk (2010)
- Sound of a Flower (2018)

With Chuck Israels

- Joyful Noise (Soulpatch, 2015)
- Garden of Delights (Dot Time, 2016)
- Concerto Peligroso (Dot Time, 2017)
- Bass Intentions (Soulpatch, 2019)

With Alan Jones

- Storyline (2015)

With Derek Hines

- The Long Journey Home (2017)

With Various

- Babylon Berlin Original Motion Picture Soundtrack (BMG, 2017)

With Joyce DiDonato

- Songplay (Erato, 2019)

== Publications ==
- Sound-World Duets, 2015

== Awards ==
- 1st Place in Juilliard Quadrennial Trumpet Concerto Competition, 1996
- 2nd Place The International Trumpet Guild Solo Competition, 1998, 1999
- 1st Place The National Trumpet Competition, Classical Solo Division, 1999
- 1st Place The National Trumpet Competition, Jazz Division, 2000
- 2019, Grammy Award for Songplay
