= John Porter (footballer, born 1961) =

Scottish footballer

Personal information
- Full name: John Stewart Porter
- Date of birth: 27 September 1961 (age 65)
- Place of birth: Edinburgh, Scotland
- Position: Forward

Youth career
- Hutchinson Vale
- Salveson Boys Club

Senior career*
Years	Team	Apps	(Gls)
1980–1982	Hearts	0	(0)
1982–1983	Forfar Athletic	27	(6)
1983	Bonnyrigg Rose Athletic		
	Berwick Rangers	21	(3)
- Bonnyrigg Rose Athletic
1984–1986	East Fife	38	(8)
1986–1987	St. George	19	(1)
1987	Warringah Freshwater		
1988–1992	Rockdale Ilinden		
1993–1994	CYC Stanmore	33	(8)
1996–1997	Sutherland		
1998	Wollongong Olympic		
1999–2000	Sutherland		

Managerial career
- 1998–2000: Sutherland
- 2001–2004: Sydney University
- 2005–2006: Sutherland
- 2007: Sydney Wanderers
- * Club domestic league appearances and goals

John Stewart Porter is a Scottish former footballer.

== Playing career ==
=== Youth football ===
Porter played youth football for Hutchinson Vale and Salvesen Boys Club.

=== Scotland ===
After spending two years on the books at Hearts he moved to Forfar Athletic. While at Forfar Porter played 27 times scoring six goals. He then transferred to Berwick Rangers where he played 21 games. In 1984, he moved to East Fife where he spent two years.

=== Australia ===
In 1986 Porter emigrated to Australia where he played two seasons with National Soccer League team St. George. After leaving St. George Porter played for a number of NSW Premier League clubs.

== Coaching career ==
Porter began coaching with Sutherland in the NSW Premier League in 1998 while still playing. In 2000, he moved on to Sydney University where he coached until 2004. In 2005, he again took the helm at Sutherland until moving to Sydney Wanderers in 2007.
