= Robert Evelyn Porter =

Sir Robert Evelyn Porter (1913 – 1983), generally known as "Tom", was a South Australian businessman and Mayor of Adelaide from 1968 to 1971.

Porter was born in Adelaide, a son of Frederick Windmill Porter (1881–1937) and Clara Frances Niall Porter, née Cudmore (1884–1967), of Adelaide's influential Cudmore family. His grandfather was James Windmill Porter (c. 1850–1918), pioneer of top-dressing with superphosphates; a great-grandfather was Patrick Gay, of Gay's Arcade fame.

He grew up with his parents on Edwin Terrace, Gilberton and was educated at St. Peter's College.

Porter was for a time the manager of Childerley Park Station, Naracoorte, then served as a lieutenant in the 2nd AIF, promoted to major.

He followed his father in the stockbroking business, as a partner in F. W. Porter & Co. of Brookman Building on Grenfell Street, Adelaide.

Porter married June Perry, of King's Park Avenue, Crawley, Perth on 31 March 1942.

In 1949 he was elected to the Adelaide City Council as Councillor for Hindmarsh ward, and was appointed Consul for Belgium.

He was a noted polo player, winner of the Barr Smith Cup in 1950, and president of the Australian Polo Council in 1955.
