= James Porter =

James, Jamie, Jim or Jimmy Porter may refer to:

== Politics and diplomacy ==
- James Porter (Australian politician) (born 1950), former member of the Australian House of Representatives
- James Porter (diplomat) (1710–1776), British
- James Porter (Jacobite), Vice-Chamberlain of King James II of England who followed him into exile
- James Porter (New Brunswick politician) (1847–1926), farmer, miller and political figure in New Brunswick, Canada
- James Porter (New York politician) (1787–1839), U.S. Representative from New York
- James D. Porter (1828–1912), Governor of Tennessee
- James E. Porter (1857–1946), mayor of Kansas City, Kansas
- James Madison Porter (1793–1862), American cabinet secretary
- James W. Porter (politician) (fl. 1940s), American politician from New York

== Sport ==
- James Porter (cricketer) (fl. 1844–1845), English cricketer
- Jamie Porter (born 1993), English cricketer
- Jim Porter (born 1949), Australian rugby player
- Jim Porter (Australian rules footballer) (1892–1936)
- Jimmy Porter (football manager) (1901–1967), manager of Manchester United F.C. of Bury F.C.

== Fiction ==
- Jimmy Porter, principal character in John Osborne's 1956 play Look Back in Anger
- James Porter, character in Disney's 2008 film College Road Trip
- Jim Porter, minor television series character, list of Falling Skies characters

== Other ==
- James Porter (Catholic priest) (1935–2005), defrocked American priest and child molester
- James Porter (Presbyterian minister) (1753–1798), Irish presbyterian minister and satirist
- James Porter (Master of Peterhouse, Cambridge) (1827–1900), British academic
- James A. Porter (1905–1970), African American art historian, author of Modern Negro Art
- James A. Porter (novelist) (1836–1897), American novelist
- James Ezekiel Porter (1847–1876), American soldier in the Battle of the Little Bighorn
- James Frederick Porter (1855–1919), Australian engineer and mine manager
- James Herbert Porter (died 1973), English brewer and brewing executive
- James Madison Porter III (1864–1928), American civil engineer
- James W. Porter (judge) (1887–1959), justice of the Idaho Supreme Court
- James W. Porter (ecologist) (born 1946), American ecologist
- James W. Porter II (born 1949), American lawyer and gun rights activist
- Jim Porter (giant) (1811–1859), American tavern keeper and coach driver
