= German submarine U-515 =

German World War II submarine

Coordinates: 34.583°N 19.300°W

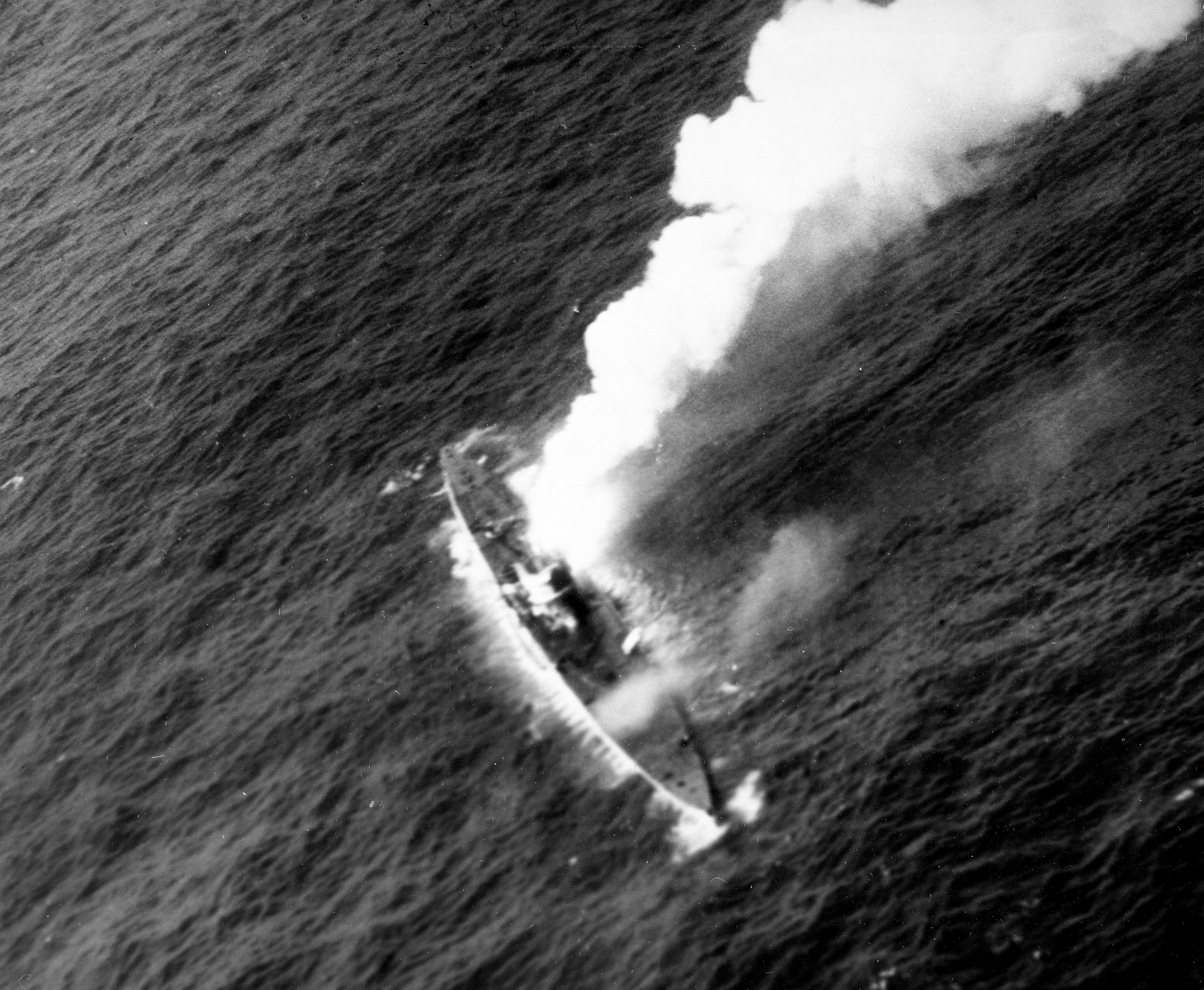
- U-515 afire and sinking on 9 April 1944

History

Nazi Germany
- Name: U-515
- Ordered: 14 February 1940
- Builder: Deutsche Werft, Hamburg
- Yard number: 311
- Laid down: 8 May 1941
- Launched: 2 December 1941
- Commissioned: 21 February 1942
- Fate: Sunk on 9 April 1944

General characteristics
- Class & type: Type IXC submarine
- Displacement: 1,120 t (1,100 long tons) surfaced; 1,232 t (1,213 long tons) submerged
- Length: 76.76 m (251 ft 10 in) o/a; 58.75 m (192 ft 9 in) pressure hull
- Beam: 6.76 m (22 ft 2 in) o/a; 4.40 m (14 ft 5 in) pressure hull
- Height: 9.60 m (31 ft 6 in)
- Draught: 4.70 m (15 ft 5 in)
- Installed power: 4,400 PS (3,200 kW; 4,300 bhp) (diesels); 1,000 PS (740 kW; 990 shp) (electric)
- Propulsion: 2 shafts; 2 × diesel engines; 2 × electric motors
- Speed: 18.3 knots (33.9 km/h; 21.1 mph) surfaced; 7.3 knots (13.5 km/h; 8.4 mph) submerged
- Range: 13,450 nmi (24,910 km; 15,480 mi) at 10 knots (19 km/h; 12 mph) surfaced; 63 nmi (117 km; 72 mi) at 4 knots (7.4 km/h; 4.6 mph) submerged
- Test depth: 230 m (750 ft)
- Complement: 4 officers, 44 enlisted
- Armament: 6 × torpedo tubes (4 bow, 2 stern); 22 × 53.3 cm (21 in) torpedoes; 1 × 10.5 cm (4.1 in) SK C/32 deck gun (180 rounds); 1 × 3.7 cm (1.5 in) SK C/30 AA gun; 1 × twin 2 cm FlaK 30 AA guns

Service record
- Part of: 4th U-boat Flotilla; 21 February – 31 August 1942; 10th U-boat Flotilla; 1 September 1942 – 9 April 1944
- Identification codes: M 27 488
- Commanders: Kptlt. Werner Henke; 21 February 1942 – 9 April 1944
- Operations: 7 patrols: 1st patrol: 15 August – 14 October 1942; 2nd patrol: 7 November 1942 – 6 January 1943; 3rd patrol: 21 February – 24 June 1943; 4th patrol: 21 – 22 August 1943; 5th patrol: a. 29 August – 12 September 1943; b. 1 – 3 November 1943; 6th patrol: 9 November 1943 – 14 January 1944; 7th patrol: 30 March – 9 April 1944
- Victories: 22 merchant ships sunk (140,196 GRT); 1 auxiliary warship sunk (10,850 GRT); 1 merchant ship total loss (4,668 GRT); 1 warship total loss (1,350 tons); 1 merchant ship damaged (6,034 GRT); 1 warship damaged (1,920 tons)

German submarine U-515 was a Type IXC U-boat (Unterseeboot) of Nazi Germany's Kriegsmarine built for service during World War II. She was commissioned on 21 February 1942 and sunk on 9 April 1944. U-515 completed seven operational patrols and sank 23 ships, badly damaged two ships which later sank, and damaged two additional ships.

== Design ==
German Type IXC submarines]were slightly larger than the original Type IXBs. U-515 had a displacement of 1,120 tonnes (1,100 long tons) when at the surface and 1,232 tonnes (1,213 long tons) while submerged. The U-boat had a total length of 76.76 m (251 ft 10 in), a pressure hull length of 58.75 m (192 ft 9 in), a beam of 6.76 m (22 ft 2 in), a height of 9.60 m (31 ft 6 in), and a draft of 4.70 m (15 ft 5 in). The boat was powered by two MAN M 9 V 40/46 supercharged, four-stroke, nine-cylinder, diesel engines producing a total of 4,400 metric horsepower (3,240 kW; 4,340 shp) for use while surfaced and two Siemens-Schuckert 2 GU 345/34 double-acting electric motors producing a total of 1,000 shaft horsepower (1,010 PS; 750 kW) for use while submerged. She had two shafts and two 1.92 m (6 ft) propellers. The boat was capable of operating at depths down to 230 m (750 ft).

The submarine had a maximum surface speed of 18.3 knots (33.9 km/h; 21.1 mph) and a maximum submerged speed of 7.3 knots (13.5 km/h; 8.4 mph). When submerged, the boat could operate for 63 nautical miles (117 km; 72 mi) at 4 knots (7.4 km/h; 4.6 mph); when surfaced, she could travel 13,450 nautical miles (24,910 km; 15,480 mi) at 10 knots (19 km/h; 12 mph). U-515 was fitted with six 53.3 cm (21 in) torpedo tubes (four at the bow and two at the stern), 22 torpedoes, one 10.5 cm (4.13 in) SK C/32 naval gun, 180 rounds, and a 3.7 cm (1.5 in) SK C/30, as well as a 2 cm (0.79 in) C/30 antiaircraft gun. The boat had a complement of 48.

== Service history ==
U-515's keel was laid down on 8 May 1941 at Deutsche Werft in Hamburg, Germany. She was launched on 2 December 1941, commissioned on 21 February 1942 under the command of Kapitänleutnant Werner Henke, and attached to the 4th U-boat Flotilla for training. During this period, U-515 conducted listening tests in early May, torpedo firing tests, and in early July, tactical exercises with other U-boats. U-515 served with the 4th U-boat Flotilla until 31 August 1942, then joined the 10th U-boat Flotilla for operations.

=== First patrol ===
U-515 left Stettin on 8 September 1942, stopping at Kiel to top-up with fuel. She left Kiel on 11 September for her first patrol, during which she sank nine ships and damaged one other:

- Stanvac Melbourne – Panamanian tanker, sunk on 12 September by torpedoes
- Woensdrecht – Dutch tanker, sunk on 12 September by torpedoes
- Nimba – Panamanian freighter, sunk on 13 September by torpedoes
- Ocean Vanguard – British freighter, sunk on 13 September by torpedoes
- Harborough – British freighter, sunk on 14 September by torpedo and deck gun
- Sørholt – Norwegian freighter, sunk on 15 September by torpedoes
- Mae – American freighter, sunk on 17 September with deck gun
- Reedpool – British freighter, sunk on 20 September by torpedoes
- Antinous – American freighter, damaged by torpedo on 23 September, sunk by U-512 on 24 September
- Lindvangen – Norwegian freighter, sunk on 23 September by torpedoes

U-515 returned to her base at Lorient, in occupied France on 14 October.

=== Second patrol ===
U-515 left Lorient on 7 November for her second patrol. While moving along the African coast on the night of 11 November, she attacked a British depot ship (probably HMS Hecla, which was attacked on 11 November and sank on the 12th), and was subsequently attacked with depth charges by a British destroyer (probably HMS Venomous). While sailing through the mid-Atlantic on 6 December, the U-boat spotted and sank the passenger ship Ceramic. U-515 patrolled the Azores for about a week, then returned to Lorient on 5 or 6 January 1943.

=== Third patrol ===
Minor repairs were carried out, and on 21 February 1943, the U-boat left Lorient for her third patrol. She sank the British freighter California Star about 335 miles northwest of the Azores on 4 March, and on 9 April, she sank a second ship, the French freighter Bamako off the West African coast. On 29 April, the U-boat was attacked by Catalina flying boats. U-515 fired at the aircraft with her 20 mm antiaircraft (AA) guns, but did not shoot any down. The aircraft did not cause any damage to her; she submerged after the attack. During a 12-hour period on the night of 30 April and 1 May, U-515 attacked Convoy TS 37 off Freetown and sank seven ships:

- Kota Tjandi – Dutch freighter, sunk on 30 April by torpedoes
- Bandar Shapour – British freighter, sunk on 30 April by torpedoes
- Corabella – British freighter, sunk on 30 April by torpedoes
- Nagina – British freighter, sunk on 30 April by torpedoes
- Mokambo – Belgian freighter, attacked on 1 May with torpedoes, sank on 2 May
- City of Singapore – British freighter, sunk on 1 May by torpedoes
- Clan MacPherson – British freighter, sunk on 1 May by torpedoes

A few days after the attack on convoy TS 37, U-515 was resupplied with fuel and torpedoes by U-460. She continued on her patrol and on 9 May sank the Norwegian freighter Cornville with torpedoes. U-515 completed her third sortie, returning to Lorient on 24 June. In recognition of a successful patrol, all crewmen were given long leaves and many were awarded the Iron Cross, Second Class.

=== Fourth patrol ===
Extensive repairs and modifications were carried out at Lorient. Here, she also received a Turm IV conning tower with a wintergarten and equipped with a nonstandard complement of three twin C/38 20 mm AA cannons, two side by side on the upper platform and a third on the wintergarten. She could not be equipped with a 2cm Flakvierling 38 due to a lack of availability at Lorient. She also carried four T5 Zaunkönig acoustic-homing torpedoes. U-515 left Lorient on 29 August to patrol the west coast of Africa. About one week in, she spotted a convoy off the Azores and started to attack, but she was detected by a convoy escort and badly damaged by depth charges, which forced her to return to base for repairs, reaching Lorient on 12 September.

=== Fifth patrol ===
Repairs took six weeks and were completed by late October. On 1 November 1943, U-515 left Lorient, stopping at St. Nazaire to pick up two T5 Zaunkönig torpedoes, which were designed with either a magnetic or percussion fuse and which were faster and had a longer range than the G7e/T4 Falke torpedoes. U-515 left St. Nazaire on 9 November and patrolled off the Azores and Portuguese coast. On the morning of 18 November, she spotted a convoy, but was, in turn, spotted by aircraft. The U-boat submerged, but was detected by destroyers. These three ships attacked U-515 with depth charges for several hours and caused major damage. The main ballast tank and reserve oil tank were ruptured; several batteries, the electronics, and the forward hydroplane motor were also damaged. U-515 fired a T-5 acoustic torpedo at one of the escorts, HMS Chanticleer, hitting her and causing damage beyond repair. Several more attacks were made, and U-515 had nearly run out of air when the attacks finally stopped, and she was able to surface. Despite extensive damage, the crew decided to make repairs at sea, which were completed on 22 November. U-515 started to patrol the west coast of Africa and on 17 December, torpedoed and sank the British freighter Kingswood. Two days later, she sank another ship, the British freighter Phemius. While returning to base, she sank the British freighter MV Dumana on 24 December. On 16 January 1944, U-515 reached Lorient.

=== Sixth and final patrol ===
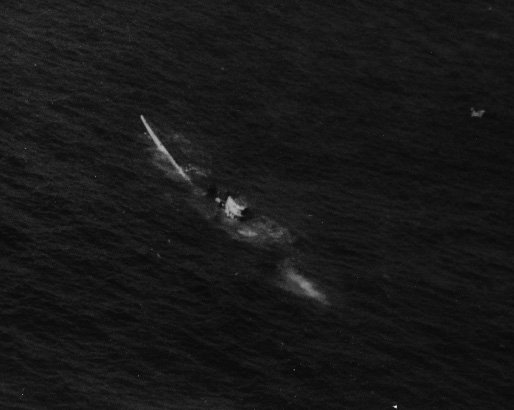
U-515 sinking

Major repairs were carried out on U-515, including the installation of new batteries and a 3.7 cm M42U flak gun. Repairs were completed by late March, and on the 30th, she left Lorient. On 8 April 1944, U-515 spotted a carrier-based aircraft and submerged; an hour later, she surfaced and was attacked by another aircraft. U-515 engaged the machine with her 3.7 cm AA gun. The plane's bombs missed the U-boat and U-515 failed to shoot down the aircraft.

On 9 April, U-515 was attacked north of Madeira by the destroyers USS Pope, Pillsbury, Chatelain, and Flaherty. Flooding and loss of depth control forced the U-boat to the surface, where she was sunk by rockets fired from Grumman Avenger and Grumman Wildcat aircraft and gunfire from the destroyers.

Sixteen of U-515's crew were killed, but 44 survived the attack. The survivors were picked up by the destroyers and later transferred to the aircraft carrier USS Guadalcanal. U-515's commander, Werner Henke, was among the survivors. Later in June 1944, he was shot and killed trying to escape a secret interrogation center known as P. O. Box 1142 in Fort Hunt, Virginia, while being held as a prisoner of war.

== Tonnage sunk ==
During U-515's career, she sank 23 ships and damaged two others, which later sank, and damaged another two ships which did not sink. Of the 25 total ships sunk, 22 were freighters totaling 140,196 gross register tons (GRT), one was an auxiliary warship of 10,850 GRT, one was a freighter of 4,668 GRT that later sank, and one was a warship that later sank for another 1,350 tons. U-515 also damaged one freighter of 6,034 GRT and damaged one warship of 1,920 tons.

== Wolfpacks ==
U-515 took part in four wolfpacks, namely:

- Westwall (8 November – 16 December 1942)
- Unverzagt (12 – 19 March 1943)
- Seeräuber (25 – 30 March 1943)
- Schill 1 (16 – 22 November 1943)

== Summary of raiding history ==
History (Note: Merchant ship tonnages are in gross register tons. Military vessels are listed by tons displacement.)
Date	Ship Name	Nationality	GRT	Fate
12 September 1942	Stanvac Melbourne	Panama	10,013	Sunk
12 September 1942	Woensdrecht	Netherlands	4,668	Total loss
13 September 1942	Nimba	Panama	1,854	Sunk
13 September 1942	Ocean Vanguard	United Kingdom	7,174	Sunk
14 September 1942	Harborough	United Kingdom	5,415	Sunk
15 September 1942	Sørholt	Norway	4,801	Sunk
17 September 1942	Mae	United States	5,607	Sunk
20 September 1942	Reedpool	United Kingdom	4,838	Sunk
23 September 1942	Antinous	United States	6,034	Damaged
23 September 1942	Lindvangen	Norway	2,412	Sunk
12 November 1942	HMS Hecla	Royal Navy	10,850	Sunk
12 November 1942	HMS Marne	Royal Navy	1,920	Damaged
7 December 1942	Ceramic	United Kingdom	18,713	Sunk
4 March 1943	California Star	United Kingdom	8,300	Sunk
9 April 1943	Bamako	Free France	2,357	Sunk
30 April 1943	Bandar Shahpour	United Kingdom	5,236	Sunk
30 April 1943	Corabella	United Kingdom	5,682	Sunk
30 April 1943	Kota Tajandi	Netherlands	7,295	Sunk
30 April 1943	Nagina	United Kingdom	6,551	Sunk
1 May 1943	City of Singapore	United Kingdom	6,555	Sunk
1 May 1943	Clan Macpherson	United Kingdom	6,940	Sunk
1 May 1943	Mokambo	Belgium	4,996	Sunk
9 May 1943	Corneville	Norway	4,544	Sunk
18 May 1943	HMS Chanticleer	Royal Navy	1,350	Total loss
17 December 1943	Kingswood	United Kingdom	5,080	Sunk
20 December 1943	Phemius	United Kingdom	7,406	Sunk
24 December 1943	Dumana	United Kingdom	8,427	Sunk

== Bibliography ==
- Bishop, Chris (2006). Kriegsmarine U-Boats, 1939−45. London: Amber Books. ISBN 978-1-904687-96-2.
- Gröner, Erich; Jung, Dieter; Maass, Martin (1991). U-boats and Mine Warfare Vessels. German Warships 1815–1945. Vol. 2. Translated by Thomas, Keith; Magowan, Rachel. London: Conway Maritime Press. ISBN 0-85177-593-4.
- Kemp, Paul (1999). U-Boats Destroyed - German Submarine Losses in the World Wars. London: Arms & Armour. ISBN 1-85409-515-3.
- Miller, D. (2000). U-Boats: the Illustrated History of the Raiders of the Deep. Washington: Brassey's. ISBN 978-1-57-488246-9.
- Navy Department Office of the Chief of Naval Operations, Washington. Report of the interrogation of survivors from U-515 sunk on 9 April 1944 and U-68 sunk on 10 April 1944. Washington, 17 June 1944. Retrieved 30 May 2007. From "U-boat Archive - U-515 - Interrogation Report".
