= MIS-X =

United States equivalent of the UK's MI9

Military Intelligence Service, Section X
Agency overview
- Formed: May, 1942
- Dissolved: May 9, 1945
- Headquarters: Post Office Box 1142, Fort Hunt
- Agency executives: Catesby ap C. Jones, Commander; William Stull Holt, Liaison Officer to MI9
- Parent department: United States Department of War
- Parent agency: Military Intelligence Service
- Child agency: MIS-X, London Office

The Military Intelligence Service, Escape and Evasion Section, or MIS-X, was a section of the Military Intelligence Service and the United States Department of War that operated during World War II. It was an escape and evasion organization, and aided U.S. servicemen held as prisoners of war (POWs) and those evading capture in enemy territory. They worked closely with MI9 to establish escape and evasion lines. The section, which was modeled after MI9, was disbanded at the war's end.

The organization was divided into five sections: interrogation, correspondence, prisoner of war locations, training and briefing, and technical. It was commanded by Colonel Catesby ap C. Jones. To avoid revealing the purpose of the organization, it was referred to by its Post Office Box 1142, rather than its location at Fort Hunt. The interrogations handled by MIS-X were of recently escaped Allied POWs, not to be confused with the duties of its counterpart, MIS-Y, which handled the housing and interrogations of enemy German and Japanese POWs.

MIS-X was based in Fort Hunt, Virginia. Secret equipment such as small compasses, maps, and radios were smuggled into German prisoner of war camps; to avoid compromising legitimate aid organizations like the Red Cross, MIS-X invented its own aid organizations and created aid packages from these, in which secret items were hidden. A radio code was devised to send messages via BBC broadcasts; this was based on Morse code: a one-syllable word was a dot, a two syllable word a dash. Such messages were preceded by a bell tone. A method of hiding a message in innocuous-looking outgoing letters to the United States was devised: all incoming letters were screened for such messages before delivery. These were signaled by having the date in numbers rather than letters. American officers who were privy to the secret and codes debriefed incoming prisoners and sent any useful information back to the United States.

In a controversial decision, at the end of the war, following the Surrender of Japan, the War Department ordered that all documents belonging to MIS-X be destroyed. Over the course of 36 hours, the staff worked nonstop to burn all records and documents in their possession. The documents that do survive are those that were not in their possession at the time.

== See also ==
- MI9, the British equivalent of MIS-X

== Bibliography ==
- Allied Forces. MIS-X Activities in Southwest Pacific Area. APO 500: General Headquarters, Southwest Pacific Area, 1945.
- Allied Forces. Evasion in Korea and Southeast Manchuria. [Place of publication not identified]: MIS-X, SWPA, 1945.
- Allied Forces. Evasion in North China. [Place of publication not identified]: MIS-X, SWPA, 1945.
- Day, Philip J., David C. Taylor, David Winter, Nils Cowan, and J. V. Martin. Escape factory. London: Sky Vision, 2009. Summary: This documentary reveals the true story behind MIS-X, a secret agency set up during World War II, assigned to supply 'escape aids' to American POWs in Europe. But why was MIS-X nearly erased from the pages of history?
- I. C. B. Dear, and M. R. D. Foot. MIS-X. Oxford University Press, 2001. The Oxford Companion to World War II. Abstract: the US equivalent of the British escape and evasion organization MI9. In China, where it was set up in.
- Ottis, Sherri Greene. Silent Heroes: Downed Airmen and the French Underground. 2009. Abstract: In the early years of World War II it was an amazing feat for an allied airman shot down over occupied Europe to make it back to Britain. By 1943 they had a 50 percent chance of evading capture. An estimated 12,000 French civilians helped make this possible.
- Shoemaker, Lloyd R. The Escape Factory: The Story of MIS-X. New York: St. Martin's Paperbacks, 1992.
- United States. An Evasion Story from China. MIS-X Section, U.S. Army Forces, Pacific, 1945.
- United States. The Secrets of P.O. Box 1142: An Interpretive Concept for Fort Hunt Visitor Contact Station. [Alexandria, VA?]: [National Park Service], 2009. Abstract: "The men and women who served at P.O. Box 1142 worked on programs MIS-Y and OP-16-Z, interrogation of high ranking prisoners of war; MIS-X, escape and evasion aid to captured American servicemen; and MIRS, analysis of captured documents. Their efforts gained intelligence on enemy research in rocketry, the atomic bomb, the jet engine, U-boats, microwaves and infrared technology"
- Van Cleve, Thomas C. Activities of Two Agencies of the CPM Branch, MIS, G-2, NDGS: the Interrogation Section, Fort Hunt, Virginia; Tracy, California and the MIS-X Section Fort Hunt, Virginia (Covering the Period from 1 August 1942 to 1 August 1945). 1945. Summary: Contains a history of the origin and activation of the Interrogation Branch, Interrogation Centers, techniques of interrogation, selection of interrogees, process and interrogation reports, and equipment used.
- Vance, Jonathan Franklin William. Encyclopedia of Prisoners of War and Internment. Santa Barbara, Calif: ABC-CLIO, 2000. Summary: The entries in this encyclopedia are intended to be self-contained, but cross-references to other, related entries have been provided wherever possible. Of the thousands of published sources on captivity in wartime, only the most significant and most likely to be easily obtainable were selected.
- Wichtrich, A. R. MIS-X Top Secret. England: Raleigh, N.C., 1997.
- Winfrey, Robley E. Robley E. Winfrey Collection, 1939-1945. 1939. Summary: A collection of escape and survival materials including papers, maps, compasses and other types of materials used by allied forces of the intelligence group "MIS-X" during World War II. Notes: The Iowa State College Bulletin, vol. xli, no. 1, June 3, 1942. On cover: Iowa State College of Agriculture and Mechanic Arts. Official publication, vol. xxx, no. 3, June 17, 1931.
- Wood, Lindsey, Michael J. Galgano, Gabrielle M. Lanier, and Steven W Guerrier. Fort Hunt's P.O. Box 1142. 2016. Summary: Fort Hunt is a World War Two prisoner of war camp in Alexandria, Virginia. It housed more than 3,000 Axis prisoners and several war related programs, MIRS, MIS-Y and MIS-X. The World War Two POW experience is a missing part of the story, and Fort Hunt can help illuminate an important part of the United States' war effort and responsibility. Fort Hunt was a secret location, and its activities included gathering and deciphering German written materials, interrogating Axis, mainly German, prisoners of war, as well as creating and distributing Escape and Evasion packages to air and ground forces in Europe. Today, Fort Hunt is a recreational park owned by the National Park service and the George Washington Memorial parkway. This camp remained secret until recently, when George Washington Memorial parkway employees began investigating its history. Since then, there has been an effort to preserve and present its most recent history to the public. This project began at the National Archives and Records Administration in College Park, Maryland, combing through the documents of Fort Hunt's past during World War Two, gathering information on its establishment and programs in hopes to bring attention to this important site. This project includes recommendations on how to present Fort Hunt's World War Two story to its visitors, with photographs of what the park looks like today. I would like to thank my thesis director, Dr. Michael Galgano, and both of my readers and committee members, Dr. Gabrielle Lanier and Dr. Steven Guerrier, for their assistance in this project.
