= James W. Porter =

James W. Porter may refer to:

- James W. Porter (Kansas politician) (March 1, 1911 - ?), a lawyer and state legislator in Kansas national ho served in the Kansas Senate 1949 through 1960
- James W. Porter (politician) (fl. 1940s), American politician from New York
- James W. Porter (judge) (1887–1959), justice of the Idaho Supreme Court
- James W. Porter (ecologist) (born 1946), American ecologist
- James W. Porter II (born 1949), American lawyer and gun rights activist
