= Heinz Schlicke =

Dr. Heinz Max Schlicke
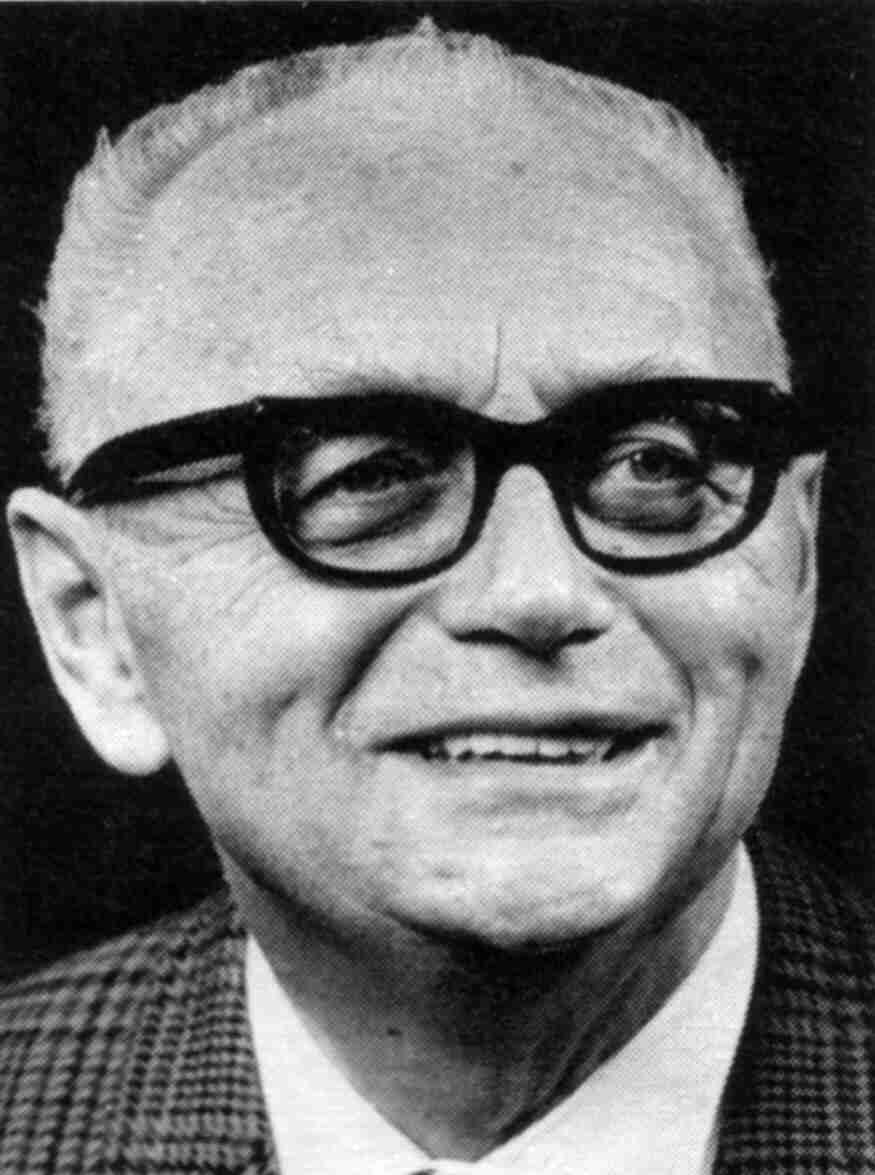
- Born: December 13, 1912 near Dresden, Germany
- Died: April 18, 2006 (aged 93); Tampa, Florida
- Education: Dresden University of Technology
- Occupations: Engineer and Author
- Employer: Allen-Bradley (1950-1974)
- Known for: IEEE Fellow (1967)

Heinz Schlicke (December 13, 1912 – April 18, 2006), was a German-born engineer and author, an Operation Paperclip scientist, and engineer at the Allen-Bradley Co. in Milwaukee, Wisconsin.

He received both his Master's and Doctor's degrees in engineering sciences at the Institute of Technology in Dresden, Germany in 1937, working under Dr. Heinrich Barkhausen. His thesis subject was on the "Entrainment of Oscillators and Sub-Harmonics". During World War II he served in the Kriegsmarine working his way from the rank of Naval Engineer (Marinebaurat) to Lieutenant-Commander (Korvettenkapitan). Near the end of the war he was sent on a special mission to transport high-technology information and supplies to Japan on board the submarine U-234. On May 8, 1945, the war with Germany ended, and on May 14 the U-234 surrendered to the United States. Schlicke was taken to a secret POW camp codenamed P. O. Box 1142, based in Fort Hunt, Virginia. He was repatriated to Germany in 1946, but was invited to return to the United States to work under Operation Paperclip at the Office of Naval Research in Sands Point, New York. His work there consisted of what is now known as stealth technology.

In September, 1950 he accepted a job with the Allen-Bradley Company in Milwaukee, Wisconsin to manage the development of ferrite based electronic components. While working there, he authored the book Essentials of Dielectromagnetic Engineering in 1961 which deals with ferrites and dielectric materials. In the late 1960s and early 1970s, he became involved with Electromagnetic compatibility EMC issues, becoming the president of the IEEE Electromagnetic Compatibility Society, and in 1967 an IEEE Fellow. He retired from Allen-Bradley in 1974, but continued to work in the EMC field consulting and authoring another book Electromagnetic Compossibility in 1982. In 1994 he coauthored a personal development book with his son Lutz Schlicke, titled Ready for any Challenge. Dr. Schlicke died in his sleep in 2006 at the age of 93.
