= HMS Hecla (1940) =

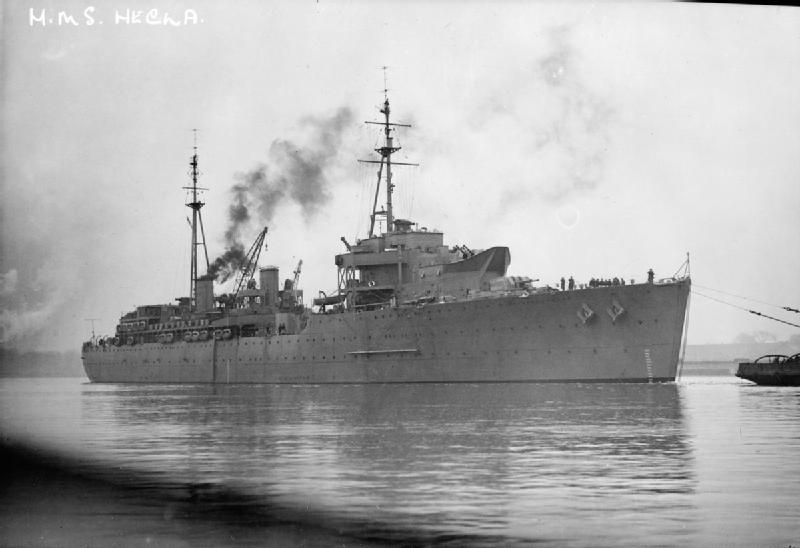
- Hecla under tow.

History

United Kingdom
- Name: HMS Hecla
- Builder: John Brown & Co Ltd, Clydebank
- Laid down: 23 January 1939
- Launched: 14 March 1940
- Commissioned: 6 January 1941
- Fate: Sunk on 12 November 1942

General characteristics
- Class & type: Hecla-class destroyer tender
- Displacement: 10,850 long tons (11,024 t) full
- Length: 600 ft (180 m)
- Beam: 66 ft (20 m)
- Draft: 16 ft (4.9 m)
- Propulsion: 2 Parsons geared turbines, 7,500 shp (5,593 kW), twin screws
- Speed: 17 knots (31 km/h; 20 mph)
- Complement: 847 crew

HMS Hecla (F20) was a destroyer tender of the Royal Navy in World War II. In addition to ample space for stores to resupply shorter-ranged destroyers at sea, Hecla boasted 20,000 sq ft (1,900 m^{2}) of workshop space and three cranes, one rated at 10-tons and the other two at 4-tons apiece.

== Service history ==
Following commissioning and work-up, Hecla sailed for the North Atlantic to support anti-submarine operations in the ongoing Battle of the Atlantic. Based first at Hvalfjord, Iceland, it was there that she tended to the captured German submarine U-570 before the vessel was towed to the United Kingdom, where she was renamed HMS Graph and entered service with the Royal Navy.

Reassigned, Hecla left Iceland bound for the Far East, but her journey was interrupted by an encounter with a German mine. On 15 May 1942 she struck, amidships, one of 80 mines laid a month prior by the auxiliary minelayer Doggerbank, killing 24 and wounding another 112 men. The worst of the damage was to her workshops and storerooms, scattering and destroying dozens of mines, torpedoes, and depth charges. Fortunately, none of these detonated. With her steering gear out of commission, the cruiser HMS Gambia towed Hecla to Simonstown, a suburb of Cape Town, South Africa for repairs. The remainder of May and June were spent in drydock, repairing extensive underwater damage. In July she conducted trials and then returned to drydock for additional work, finally returning to operational status in September. From South Africa the ship steamed north in support of Operation Torch, the Allied invasion of North Africa.

== Loss ==
In the early hours of the morning on 12 November 1942, Hecla was torpedoed by U-515 under the command of Werner Henke. The submarine fired a spread of four torpedoes at its target, though only one hit. That hit, in the engine room, was not immediately fatal to the ship. The submarine followed its first four shots with three additional torpedoes, sinking the ship approximately 180 mi (290 km) west of Gibraltar. The sinking resulted in 281 casualties. Though one of Hecla's two escorts, HMS Marne was badly damaged at the same time the other, HMS Venomous, rescued 568 survivors and landed them at Casablanca.

The wreck lies at an approximate depth of 14,100 ft (4,300 m), in position 35° 43'N, 9° 54'W.
