= HMS Venomous =

Destroyer of the Royal Navy

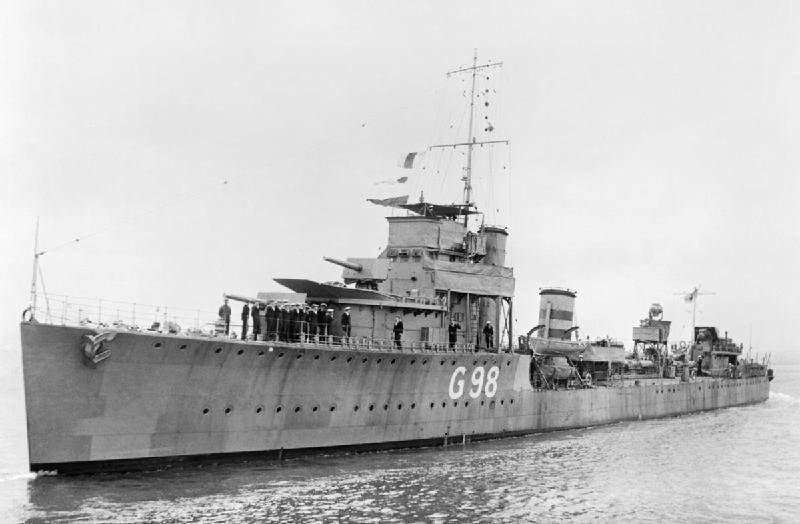
- HMS Venomous ca. 1919, when her pennant number was G98

History

United Kingdom
- Name: HMS Venom
- Ordered: January 1918
- Builder: John Brown & Company, Clydebank, Scotland
- Renamed: HMS Venomous, 24 April 1919
- Launched: 21 December 1918
- Completed: 24 August 1919
- Commissioned: 24 August 1919
- Decommissioned: 1929
- Recommissioned: October 1938
- Decommissioned: Late 1938?
- Recommissioned: Summer 1939
- Decommissioned: First half of 1944
- Recommissioned: August 1944
- Decommissioned: 1945
- Motto: Hostibus nocens amicis innocens (Latin: "Deadly to foes, harmless to friends")
- Honours and awards: Battle honours for: Atlantic 1940-1943; Dunkirk 1940; Arctic 1942; Malta Convoys 1942; North Africa 1942; Sicily 1943
- Fate: Sold for scrapping 4 March 1947
- Badge: A gold goblet with two intertwined green snakes on a black field

General characteristics
- Class & type: Admiralty Modified W-class destroyer
- Displacement: 1,140 tons standard, 1,550 tons full
- Length: 300 ft (91 m) o/a; 312 ft (95 m) p/p
- Beam: 29.5 feet (9.0 m)
- Draught: 9 feet (2.7 m), 11.25 feet (3.43 m) under full load
- Installed power: 27,000 shp (20,000 kW)
- Propulsion: Yarrow type Water-tube boilers, Brown-Curtis geared steam turbines, 2 shafts
- Speed: 34 kn (63 km/h; 39 mph)
- Range: 320–370 tons oil; 3,500 nmi (6,500 km; 4,000 mi) at 15 kn (28 km/h; 17 mph); 900 nmi (1,700 km; 1,000 mi) at 32 kn (59 km/h; 37 mph)
- Complement: 127
- Sensors & processing systems: Type 286M air warning radar fitted 1940; Type 271 surface warning radar fitted 1940
- Armament: As built 1920: 4 × BL 4.7 in (119 mm) Mk.I guns, mount P Mk.I; 2 × QF 2 pdr Mk.II "pom-pom" (40 mm L/39); 6 × 21 in (533 mm) torpedo tubes; 1940 SRE conversion: 3 × BL 4.7 in (120 mm) Mk.I L/45 guns; 1 × 3 in (76 mm) AA gun; 2 × QF 2 pdr Mk.II "pom-pom" (40 mm L/39); 3 × 21-inch torpedo tubes (one triple mount); 2 × depth charge racks; Twin 6-pounder army gun (1942 – replaced ‘A’ gun)

HMS Venomous (ex-Venom), was a Modified W-class destroyer of the British Royal Navy that saw service in the Russian Civil War and World War II.

== Construction and commissioning ==
Venom, the second Royal Navy ship of the name, was ordered in January 1918 as part of the 10th Order of the 1918-19 Naval Programme. She was laid down on 31 May 1918 by John Brown & Company at Clydebank, Scotland, and launched on 21 December 1918. She was renamed Venomous, the first Royal Navy ship of the name, on 24 April 1919 to avoid confusion with the Royal Navy's torpedo school, HMS Vernon. She was completed on 24 August 1919 and commissioned into service the same day. Her original pennant number, G98, assigned in June 1919, was changed to D75 during the interwar period.

== Service history ==
=== Interwar years ===
Venomous was assigned to the 2nd Destroyer Flotilla in the Atlantic Fleet. During the winter of 1919–1920, she made several cruises in the Baltic Sea, participating in the British campaign against Bolshevik and German forces in Latvia, Estonia, and Finland. In 1920, she conducted patrols to prevent smugglers from bringing guns into Ireland, and her crew took part in preventing a coal strike from paralysing the British economy.

On 8 October 1923, Venomous recommissioned at Chatham for service in the Mediterranean Fleet, in which she operated until 1929 with Valletta, Malta, as her home port. Early in her Mediterranean tour, she patrolled in support of British interests during fighting between Greece and Turkey. On 2 November 1924, she was steaming in the Grand Harbour upon returning to Valletta from a cruise in the Western Mediterranean Sea when she accidentally rammed and sank a motorboat from the light cruiser HMS Calypso; all four people aboard the motorboat were saved by a boat from the destroyer HMS Umpire.

By March 1925, Venomous was operating as part of the 4th Destroyer Flotilla in the Mediterranean. She recommissioned at Chatham on 30 April 1926 for continued service with the 4th Destroyer Flotilla in the Mediterranean. She recommissioned again on 21 August 1928.

Venomous was decommissioned in 1929 and transferred to the Reserve Fleet at Rosyth, Scotland. She was reduced to maintenance reserve on 10 July 1930.

In October 1938, Venomous briefly was recommissioned during a crisis with Nazi Germany, but she soon was placed back in reserve when the war scare abated. As tensions with Germany grew again in the summer of 1939, Venomous was recommissioned again with Donald Macintyre as her commanding officer; he would remain in command of her until January 1940 and go on to become one of the most famous convoy escort commanders of World War II.

=== World War II ===
==== September 1939 – May 1940 ====
The United Kingdom entered World War II in September 1939. That month, Venomous was assigned to the 16th Destroyer Flotilla at Portsmouth, England, to escort troop convoys carrying the British Expeditionary Force from the United Kingdom to France. Her first such convoy was on 7 September 1939, which she and the destroyer HMS Wren (D88) escorted. On 12 September 1939 the two destroyers escorted Convoy MB 2 from England to Cherbourg, France, and on 15 September they escorted Convoy DB 2. In October 1939, Venomous was reassigned to duty escorting convoys of merchant ships in the Southwestern Approaches and English Channel which she continued until May 1940.

==== The Battle of France, May–June 1940 ====
Venomous had just left Cherbourg on 10 May 1940 when she received a signal that Germany had invaded the Netherlands, Belgium, Luxembourg, and France. She was assigned to operations in support of Allied forces, and spent the next week operating in the North Sea off the Dutch coast. She and the destroyer Verity transported a party of Royal Marines to the Hook of Holland in the Netherlands on 12 May 1940. On 15 May she embarked refugees at Amsterdam in the Netherlands and picked up 46 or 48 (sources differ) refugees aboard the Dutch lifeboat Zeemanshoop in the North Sea and took them to Dover, England.

Her operations focused on the evacuation of Allied personnel and refugees as the German offensive inflicted defeat after defeat on Allied forces. At Calais, France – where she fired her antiaircraft guns at German aircraft bombing the harbour – she picked up some 200 British subjects on 21 May 1940, also loading submarine detection equipment and manufacturing equipment from a rayon factory, and transported the refugees and cargo to England. On 22 May she escorted the Isle of Man ferry Mona Queen as she transported British Army troops of the Irish Guards to Boulogne, returning to England with 212 refugees aboard. The contingent of refugees included the Austrian-born philosopher, philosopher of science, sociologist, and political economist Otto Neurath and the German designer, social scientist, and author Marie Reidemeister, who married Neurath in 1941.

On 23 May 1940, Venomous embarked a demolition party of Royal Engineers at Dover and took them to Calais to destroy port facilities there, but the party was unable to disembark due to heavy fighting in the area and Venomous returned to Dover. Later in the day, she joined the destroyers Venetia, Vimiera, Whitshed, and Wild Swan off Boulogne to evacuate troops of the British Army's Irish Guards and Welsh Guards, who had become trapped there by advancing German troops and tanks of the 2nd Panzer Division during the Battle of Boulogne. Sixty German Junkers Ju 87 Stuka dive bombers had recently attacked the harbour and French destroyers bombarding offshore, so the British ships awaited the arrival of Royal Air Force fighter cover before attempting to enter the harbour. After British aircraft arrived on the scene at 19:20 hours, Whitshed and Vimiera entered the harbour first, taking aboard as many British soldiers as possible – over 550 men each – under fire from German forces before steaming back out of the harbour at 20:25 hours, with Whitshed completely destroying two German tanks at point-blank range with her 4.7-inch (120-mm) guns as she departed.

Venomous and Wild Swan entered the harbour next, at 20:35 hours, followed by Venetia at 20:40 hours. The Germans opened fire on Venetia with heavier guns as she entered the harbour, apparently in an attempt to sink her in the harbour entrance to trap Venomous and Wild Swan and bring the evacuation operation to an end. A German shell, probably from a tank, hit Venetia, starting a fire aft and prompting her crew to jettison her torpedoes and burning Carley floats. Another shell hit her "B" gun turret, blowing overboard and killing some of the men there, and German gunfire also inflicted casualties among the men on her bridge, causing her to go out of control and briefly run aground. Gunners aboard Venomous, seeing that Venetia was in danger of being sunk, realized that the Germans had captured Fort de la Crèche on a hill overlooking the entrance and were using its coastal artillery to fire on Venetia. Venomous opened fire on the fort; her first salvo went over it, but her second salvo silenced the fort's guns by blowing off one side of the fort and much of the hillside it was on, causing artillery pieces to tumble down the hill. Venomous also detected a German light field gun in the garden of a house and fired on it; her first salvo flattened all of the trees in the garden, set the house on fire, and caused German troops in the vicinity to flee. All heavy German guns fell silent after this and, given a reprieve, Venetia, which had been hit seven times and been unable to embark any troops, was quickly refloated and backed out of the harbour at full speed at 20:48 hours. Venomous—using her engines to manoeuvre because her steering gear had jammed—and Wild Swan followed Venetia out of the harbour, also in reverse, carrying about 400 evacuees each, along the way knocking out a German tank and shooting up two German troop columns. Venomous and Wild Swan then escorted the damaged Venetia to Dover.

On 26 May 1940, Venomous began operations in support of Operation Dynamo, the evacuation of Allied personnel from the beachhead around Dunkirk, France. She made two trips on 31 May 1940, carrying 670 troops from De Panne, Belgium, and Bray-Dunes, France, on the first one and 408 troops from the pier at Dunkirk on the second. She transported 630 troops on 2 June 1940, 957 more on 3 June, and 463 troops on her final voyage from Dunkirk on 4 June. In all, she evacuated 3,128 or 4,410 troops (sources differ) in her five evacuation voyages to the Dunkirk beachhead.

==== June–December 1940 ====
Venomous was released from operations related to the Battle of France on 7 June 1940 and reassigned to convoy defence and anti-invasion patrols in the North Sea, which she conducted through August 1940. She and the destroyer Wivern were escorting Convoy FN 19 off Great Yarmouth on 11 June 1940 when they came under attack by six German aircraft, but she used skilful manoeuvring to avoid damage. In September 1940, she and Wild Swan patrolled off Boulogne, and on the night of 13–14 September 1940 they and the destroyer Malcolm bombarded German positions there.

In October 1940, Venomous was transferred to the Western Approaches for convoy escort duty. On 13 November 1940, she began a voyage to Gibraltar as part of the screen of the aircraft carrier Argus as she deployed to the Mediterranean to transport aircraft to Malta in Operation White.

On 18 December 1940, Venomous arrived at Derry, Northern Ireland, to become part of the 1st Escort Group. She was operating as part of the escort for Convoy HX 96 when she struck a mine in Liverpool Bay on 31 December 1940 and suffered serious damage, forcing to her to undergo repairs that were not complete until February 1941.

==== 1941 ====
Her repairs complete, Venomous was back in service with the 1st Escort Group at Derry in February 1941 to continue convoy escort work in the Western Approaches. In April 1941 she collided with the submarine H31 and required two weeks of repairs before returning to service in May 1941. She was escorting Convoy OB 343 off Iceland in July 1941 when she was forced to detach and return to Derry for repairs to her propulsion machinery, which lasted until September 1941. She returned to her escort group and was part of the escort of Convoy ONS 21 in October 1941. In November 1941 she was escorting Convoy OS 35 when she collided with the destroyer leader Keppel. She was withdrawn from service and in December 1941 work began at Greenock, Scotland, both to repair her and convert her into a long-range escort, as well as to install Type 271 surface warning radar.

==== 1942 ====
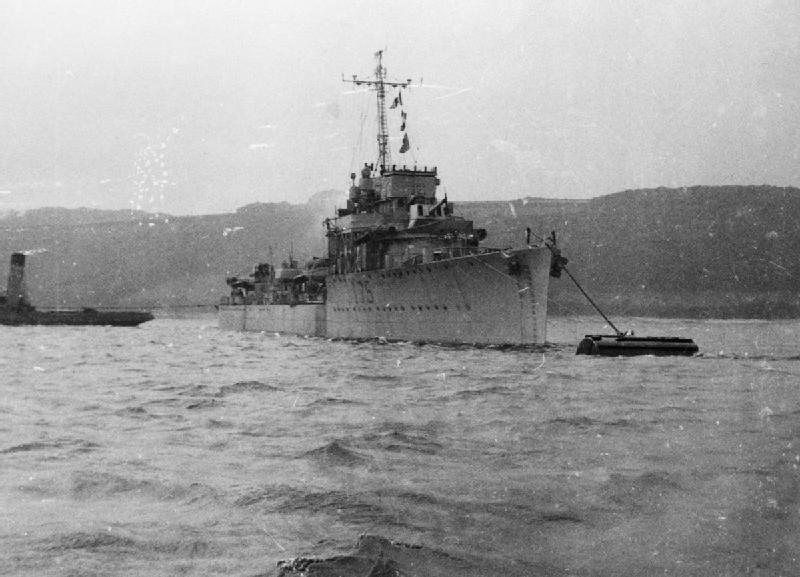
HMS Venomous during World War II

While under repair, Venomous was "adopted" by the civil community of Loughborough in Leicestershire, England, in a Warship Week campaign than ran from 5 to 14 February 1942. When her repairs, conversion, and radar installation were complete, she reported to the Home Fleet on 20 April 1942 for duty escorting Arctic convoys to the Soviet Union. From 28 April to 5 May 1942, she escorted Convoy PQ 15 bound for the Soviet Union, and from 21 to 27 May 1942 she escorted Convoy QP 12 during its voyage from the Soviet Union to the United Kingdom.

In June 1942, Venomous returned to convoy duty in the North Atlantic. She detached from this duty in July 1942 to escort the aircraft carrier Furious to the Mediterranean to deliver aircraft to Malta in Operation Bellows. She remained with Furious as she began her voyage through the Western Mediterranean toward Malta on 11 August 1942. When Operation Bellows was complete, Venomous steamed to Scapa Flow in the Orkney Islands to rejoin the Home Fleet for another period of Arctic convoy duty. In August, she was selected to participate in the escort of Convoy PQ 18 to the Soviet Union, but a boiler problem arose in September 1942 that prevented her from joining the convoy. Instead, she deployed on 10 September 1942 with the destroyers Amazon, Bulldog, Echo and Eclipse to establish a forward fuelling base for destroyers escorting PQ 18 and Convoy QP 14, which was returning from the Soviet Union to the United Kingdom.

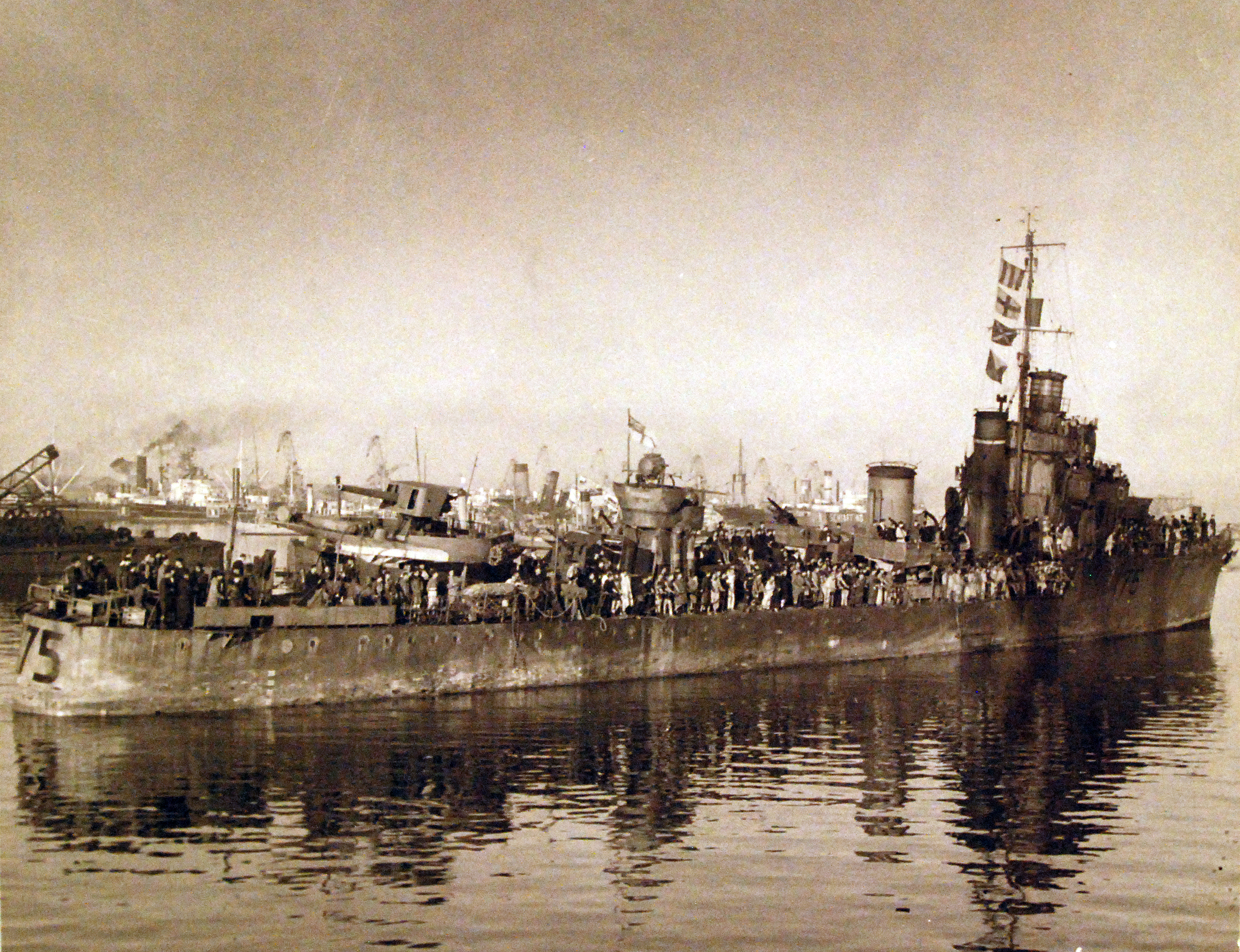
Venomous, with survivors of Hecla at Casablanca, Morocco, 17 November 1942

Venomous detached from the Home Fleet in October 1942 to escort military convoys to Gibraltar on their way to the Allied amphibious landings in French North Africa in Operation Torch, scheduled for early November 1942. On 12 November 1942 she and the destroyer Marne were escorting the repair ship Vindictive and the destroyer depot ship Hecla when she detected the German submarine U-515 with her Type 271 surface warning radar in the North Atlantic 180 nautical miles (333 km) west of Gibraltar. While she was hunting for U-515, the submarine fired four torpedoes at 00:15 hours at Hecla, which sighted and avoided two of them but was hit by the other two. While Venomous and Marne continued to hunt for U-515, the submarine torpedoed Hecla three more times, at 01:28, 01:49, and 02:06 hours, after which Hecla quickly sank at 35°43′00″N 009°54′00″W with the loss of 279 lives. Venomous and Marne began to rescue Hecla's survivors, but Marne had pulled only 64 out of the water when U-515 torpedoed her at 02:11 hours, blowing her stern off. Venomous aborted her rescue operation to counterattack, then, with 493 Hecla survivors aboard, took Marne in tow. She then made another radar contact on U-515 and dropped her tow to attack the submarine, which she finally drove off with a series of depth charge attacks. Relieved of escorting Marne by the corvette Jonquil, Venomous proceeded to Casablanca in French Morocco with 568 Hecla survivors aboard.

In December 1942, Venomous was assigned to duty escorting convoys between Gibraltar and the United Kingdom.

==== 1943 ====
Venomous was assigned to convoy escort duties in the Western Mediterranean in February 1943. In March 1943 she was selected to participate in Operation Husky, the Allied invasion of Sicily planned for July 1943, and in April 1943 she steamed to the River Clyde in Scotland to begin operations related to the build-up for Husky. On 16 April 1943, she departed the Clyde along with the escort destroyer Lauderdale, the frigates Exe and Ness, the sloops Wellington and Weston, and the cutters Gorleston and Totland as the local escort for the military convoy WS 29 during its passage from the Clyde through the Western Approaches, detaching on 20 April to return to the Clyde. Venomous continued to escort United Kingdom-to-Gibraltar Husky-related military convoys until June 1943, when she was reassigned to escort convoys in the Western Mediterranean as the date of the invasion approached. On 9 July 1943, she departed Alexandria, Egypt, as part of the escort for the military convoy MFW 37 and, upon the convoy's arrival off Syracuse, Sicily, on 13 July, three days after the initial landings, deployed to support forces ashore with gunfire and to defend the beachhead against Axis submarines and motor torpedo boats.

Released from Husky in August 1943, Venomous defended convoys in the Mediterranean until October 1943, when she returned to the United Kingdom for a refit. She was in the dockyard at Falmouth, England, for the remainder of the year.

==== 1944–1945 ====
Venomous remained out of service throughout the first half of 1944 and was decommissioned to undergo conversion into a target ship for use in training aircrews in anti-shipping attacks, with additional duty as a tender. In August 1944, she was recommissioned for service as a target ship, continuing in this role until the surrender of Germany in early May 1945. After Germany's surrender, she supported Allied forces in reoccupation operations in Europe, and on 14 May 1945 joined the destroyer leader Valorous in escorting minesweepers as they conducted minesweeping operations at Kristiansund South in Norway prior to the arrival of other Allied ships there.

== Decommissioning and disposal ==
After the surrender of Germany in early May 1945, Venomous was decommissioned and placed in reserve; by October 1945, she no longer appeared on the Royal Navy's active list. Later placed on the disposal list, she was sold on 4 March 1947 for scrapping by Metal Industries at Charlestown, Fife. She arrived at the shipbreaker's yard in July or August 1947 (sources differ) and was scrapped during 1948.

== Legacy ==
The Sea Cadet Corps training unit at Loughborough was commissioned in 1948 as TS Venomous in tribute to the ship. The unit was presented with the ship's commissioning pennant and took custody of the ship's crest and the plaque Loughborough had presented to HMS Venomous in 1942 upon adopting her during the 5–14 February 1942 Warship Week campaign. On 5 February 2012, the 70th anniversary of the beginning of that campaign, TS Venomous was completely destroyed by fire. The crest and plaque were also destroyed.

Venomous' captain, John McBeath appeared in The World at War episode "Alone" (1973), where he discussed the ship's role in the evacuation of Dunkirk.

The marine artist Robert Back served as a gunner on Venomous in 1942.

== Bibliography ==
- Campbell, John (1985). Naval Weapons of World War II. Annapolis, Maryland: Naval Institute Press. ISBN 0-87021-459-4.
- Chesneau, Roger, ed. (1980). Conway's All the World's Fighting Ships 1922–1946. Greenwich, UK: Conway Maritime Press. ISBN 0-85177-146-7.
- Colledge, J. J.; Warlow, Ben (2006) [1969]. Ships of the Royal Navy: The Complete Record of All Fighting Ships of the Royal Navy from the 15th Century to the Present (3rd Rev ed.). London: Chatham Publishing. ISBN 978-1-86176-281-8. OCLC 67375475.
- Cocker, Maurice. Destroyers of the Royal Navy, 1893–1981. Ian Allan. ISBN 0-7110-1075-7.
- Crabb, Brian James (1998). In Harm's Way. The Story of HMS Kenya. A Second World War Cruiser. England: Paul Watkins. ISBN 1-900289-02-4.
- Crabb, Brian James (2014). Operation Pedestal. The Story of Convoy WS21S in August 1942. England: Shaun Tyas. ISBN 978-1-907730-19-1.
- Friedman, Norman (2009). British Destroyers From Earliest Days to the Second World War. Annapolis, Maryland: Naval Institute Press. ISBN 978-1-59114-081-8.
- Gardiner, Robert & Gray, Randal, eds. (1985). Conway's All the World's Fighting Ships 1906–1921. Annapolis, Maryland: Naval Institute Press. ISBN 0-85177-245-5.
- Lenton, H. T. (1998). British & Empire Warships of the Second World War. Annapolis, Maryland: Naval Institute Press. ISBN 1-55750-048-7.
- March, Edgar J. (1966). British Destroyers: A History of Development, 1892–1953; Drawn by Admiralty Permission From Official Records & Returns, Ships' Covers & Building Plans. London: Seeley Service. OCLC 164893555.
- Preston, Antony (1971). 'V & W' Class Destroyers 1917–1945. London: Macdonald. OCLC 464542895.
- Raven, Alan & Roberts, John (1979). 'V' and 'W' Class Destroyers. Man o'War. Vol. 2. London: Arms & Armour. ISBN 0-85368-233-X.
- Rohwer, Jürgen (2005). Chronology of the War at Sea 1939–1945: The Naval History of World War Two (Third Revised ed.). Annapolis, Maryland: Naval Institute Press. ISBN 1-59114-119-2.
- Whinney, Bob (2000). The U-boat Peril: A Fight for Survival. Cassell. ISBN 0-304-35132-6.
- Whitley, M. J. (1988). Destroyers of World War 2. Annapolis, Maryland: Naval Institute Press. ISBN 0-87021-326-1.
- Winser, John de D. (1999). B.E.F. Ships Before, At and After Dunkirk. Gravesend, Kent: World Ship Society. ISBN 0-905617-91-6.
