= Robert Back =

British marine artist

Robert Trenaman Back (1922–2004) was a 20th-century British marine artist, known particularly for historical subjects.

== Life and career ==
Back was born in Australia in 1922, but his family returned to Britain in 1931 to live in the Norfolk estate that his father had inherited. Back's ability as an artist was clear when he went to Felsted school (with its newly built art department, funded by the Courtauld Institute), where he won the art prize three years in a row. Back used the seamen's mission run by the school in London Docks as a base for sketching during the school holidays. At age 15, these sketches won him the Royal Drawing Society's gold medal. He went on to win a scholarship to the Edinburgh School of Art. His studies there were interrupted by World War 2, when he volunteered for the Royal Navy in 1940.

Back served as a gunner in the Navy until 1946. His service included several arctic convoys in HMS Venomous, experiencing the particularly harsh conditions of these supply trips to Russia, a Malta convoy, and then on board a frigate working out of Belfast on anti-submarine patrols.

After the war, Back finished his studies at the Edinburgh School of Art. After graduation he attempted to get work in the advertising industry, but eventually took a job as an art teacher in Northern Ireland. This was followed by five years as a seaman in the Merchant Navy. After marrying Denise Edwards in 1958, Back returned to teaching, this time at a prep school in Seaford, Sussex, the town which became his home for the rest of his life. Alongside his teaching, he continued his work as an artist, eventually getting some significant success when the gallery owner Michael Henderson took an interest in his work. This led to a successful one-man exhibition in 1974, with Back becoming a full-time artist. Later, when Henderson moved his operations to the US, there were several major exhibitions on that side of the Atlantic, starting in 1983.

Back was a sought-after helmsman for yacht races after world war two, being a trialist for the Helsinki Olympic squad. When he settled in Seaford, he did not own a boat, finding it cheaper to charter for the sailing trips that he made.

Back died on 14 February 2004.
