= Arcturus, Virginia =

Unincorporated community in Virginia, United States

- Unincorporated community
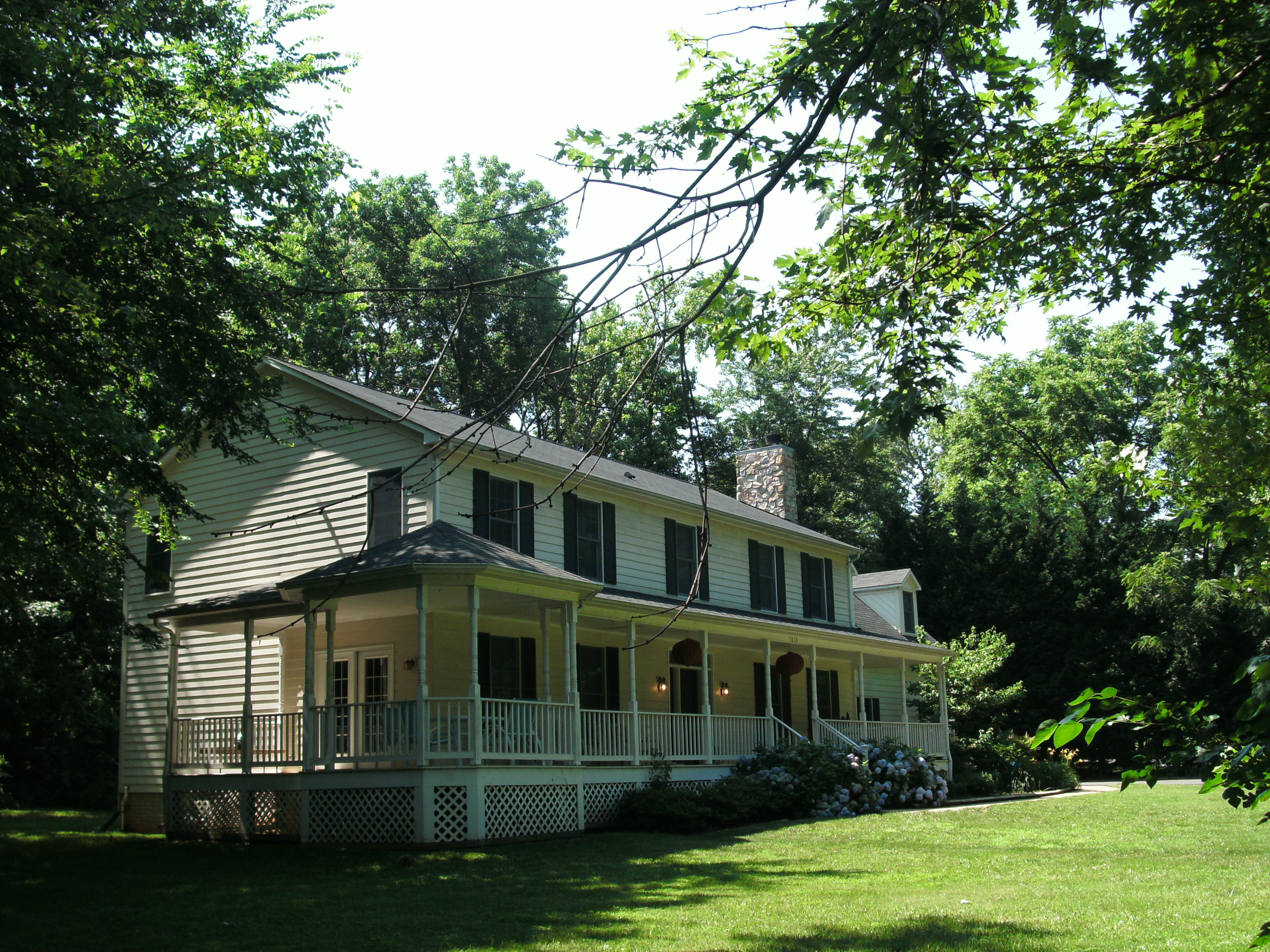
- Street scene in Arcturus

- Location within Northern Virginia Location within Virginia Location within the United States
- Coordinates: 38°44′19″N 77°2′41″W
- Country: United States
- State: Virginia
- County: Fairfax
- Time zone: UTC−5 (Eastern (EST))
  - Summer (DST): UTC−4 (EDT)
- GNIS feature ID: 1495199

Arcturus is a neighborhood within the unincorporated community of Fort Hunt in Fairfax County, Virginia, United States. Arcturus lies south of Alexandria between the George Washington Memorial Parkway and the Potomac River.
