= Jim Porter (Australian rules footballer) =

Australian rules footballer

Personal information
- Full name: James Henry Porter
- Born: 30 July 1892; Ballarat, Victoria
- Died: 12 December 1936 (aged 44); Melbourne, Victoria
- Height: 182 cm (6 ft 0 in)

Playing career^{1}
Years	Club	Games (Goals)
1910–11, 1913	Fitzroy	15 (14)
- ^{1} Playing statistics correct to the end of 1913.

James Henry Porter (30 July 1892 – 12 December 1936) was an Australian rules footballer who played with Fitzroy in the Victorian Football League (VFL).
