= James Ezekiel Porter =

American cavalry officer (1847–1876)

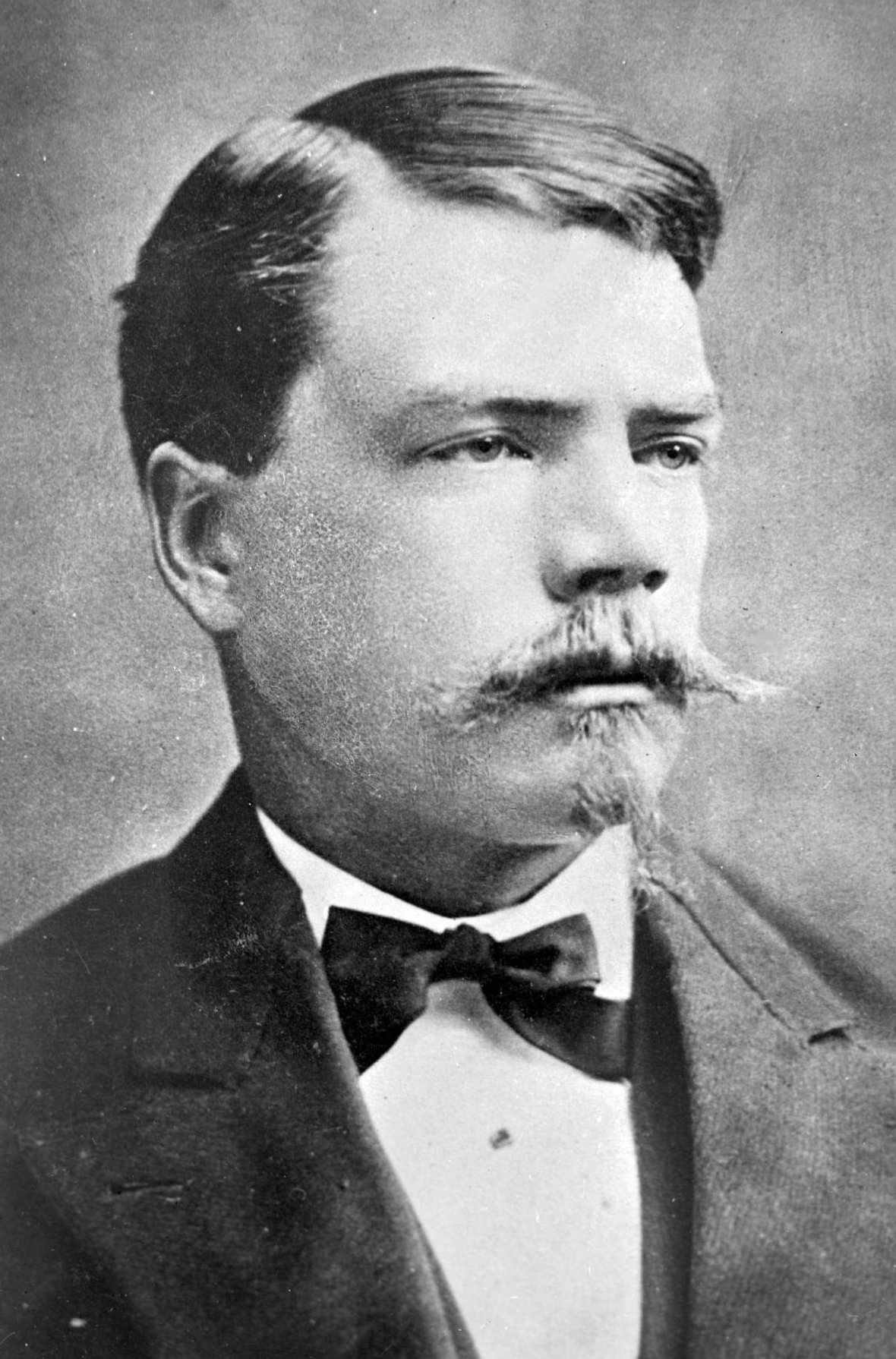
- Born: February 2, 1847; Strong, Maine, US
- Died: June 25, 1876 (aged 29); Montana, US
- Burial place: Strong Village Cemetery; Strong, Maine
- Military career
- Allegiance: United States
- Branch: United States Army
- Service years: 1869–1876
- Rank: First Lieutenant
- Unit: 7th U.S. Cavalry
- Conflicts: American Indian Wars: Battle of Little Big Horn

James Ezekiel Porter (February 2, 1847 – June 25, 1876) was one of General Custer's eleven officers killed at the Battle of Little Bighorn, also known as Custer's Last Stand, and Porter was among the first verified casualties of the historic battle alerting the world to the demise of Custer's group. According to several historians, Porter led troops in a defensive action at the Little Bighorn. Porter also served in the American South during the Reconstruction Era, where, according to a comrade, he respectably served "Ku Klux" duty while the 7th Cavalry was charged with eradicating the Ku Klux Klan and illegal distilling.

== Early life and education ==
James Ezekiel Porter was born in Strong, Maine, in 1846 to Jeremy W. Porter, a wood manufacturer and state senator and trustee of the state reform school. James Porter attended Bates College (called the Maine State Seminary until 1863) from 1862 to 1863 and then Norwich University from 1863 to 1864. Porter was then appointed to the United States Military Academy at West Point by U.S. Representative Sidney Perham, and Porter graduated in 1869, ranked 16th in a class of 39. Porter and the other officers of the 7th Cavalry "in the nineteenth century...often came from cultured backgrounds." Most officers in the Seventh Cavalry were educated at "civilian colleges" or the "prestigious Military Academy at West Point" and were part of a "stratified class system existing between commissioned and enlisted status."

Among Porter's classmates who served as general officers were Samuel Escue Tillman, William P. Duvall, Earl Dennison Thomas, Charles Morton, and William W. Robinson Jr. Among his prominent classmates who did not attain general's rank were Eric Bergland, Arthur Sherburne Hardy, and John Gregory Bourke.

== Military career ==
He received a commission as a second lieutenant in the U.S. 7th Cavalry Regiment upon graduation and was first sent to Fort Leavenworth in Kansas, then Fort Wallace and Fort Harker, also in Kansas. He participated in "The Plains" Indian warfare from 1869 to 1876 and also served "Ku Klux" duty in the South, according to a comrade, during the post-Civil War Reconstruction Era when Porter served in various cities between 1871 and 1873, including Chester, South Carolina, Rutherfordton, North Carolina, Lincolnton, North Carolina and then Shelbyville, Lebanon and Louisville, Kentucky while the 7th was charged with suppressing the Ku Klux Klan. For his efforts in serving "Ku Klux" duty, Porter was recognized by a comrade for his "energy and discretion [which] formed a combination sufficiently rare and valuable to give him a name among his fellows." In 1872, Porter became a 1st lieutenant and was assigned to Troop I. He was eventually sent back to Fort Abraham Lincoln and Fort Totten in Dakota. He served in the Northern Boundary Survey in 1873 and 1874 being based in Minnesota. Prior to the Battle at Little Bighorn in June 1876, Porter "had requested a transfer to the general staff for a more settled life" because "his wife had just given birth to their second child in March" and "the couple had moved fourteen times." When Captain Myles Keogh returned to Ireland in 1874, Porter took command of Company I.

== Death at the Little Bighorn and unidentified body ==
On June 25, 1876, James Porter was likely killed by the Sioux in the Battle of the Little Bighorn under the command of George Custer. Regarding the Sioux engagement, historian Dr. Charles Kuhlman describes "the intervention of Lieutenant Porter in bringing up Troop "I" and posting it so that the first platoon stood massed above the entrance to the ravine. This placed it squarely in the rear of the warriors Calhoun and Crittenden were fighting, compelling them to seek cover and putting them out of the fight." Historian Thomas Hatch's research also surmises that because Keogh was found with Custer, "Lt. Porter actually commanded I Company on the battlefield. Every man from this company, known as the "Wild I" for its rowdy reputation, was killed." Porter's Company I was stationed on the east side of Custer ridge in the battle, where they were either in reserve, providing aid or cover, or "attempting a breakout during the last segment of the battle." Reports from Indian Agent Valentine McGillycuddy, who spoke to Crazy Horse, and Captain Charles King, who interviewed several Indian survivors, both describe a single unidentified officer (not explicitly identified) from this east area who rode quickly through the Indian encirclement and nearly escaped, but looked back and saw a warrior pursuing him and committed suicide. On June 27, 1876, troops searching for Custer found some of the first evidence of Custer's demise in an abandoned Indian village when they "found the buckskin jacket of Lt. James Porter (Co. I) with a bloody hole on the side which covers the heart." Some parties speculated that Porter's head was also purportedly found in the village, but other sources claim this may have been another officer's (Sturgis) head, and that Porter's head was never recovered, but perhaps his torso was recovered. Among modern researchers and archaeologists, the consensus is that Porter's body was one of three officers' bodies (James Porter, James G. Sturgis, and Henry M. Harrington) never identified, even though his death was verified by his bloody jacket, which was identified. The three missing officers were the only West Point graduates on the field besides Custer and Lt. Hodgson. After receiving pressure from the officers' families, General Philip Sheridan gave special orders to his brother Lt. Colonel Michael Sheridan to locate and properly bury the twelve officers' bodies to the extent they could be located. According to Nunnally's history, "[i]n 1910 Superintendent Wright set a stone marker for Lt. Porter whose body was never found. Wright had no evidence on the location of Porter's death and simply chose a random spot for its location."

== Legacy and family ==
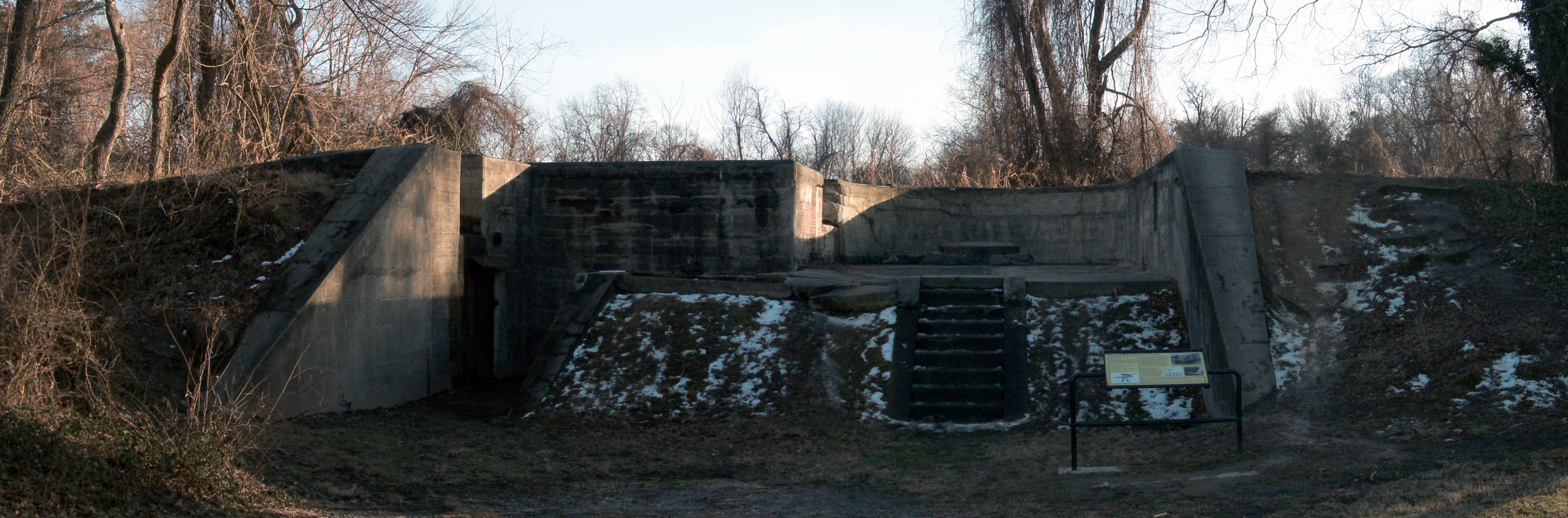
Remains of Battery Porter at Fort Hunt in Virginia. The battery was named in Porter's honor in 1903.

Porter left a wife, Eliza Frances Westcott, originally from Lewiston, Maine, whom he had married in Portland, Maine, and he also left two children. Prior to the battle Capt. Myles W. Keogh, Co. I, sensing the danger of the expedition, "left a satchel of personal papers with Mrs. Eliza Porter, the wife of Company I's Lieutenant James Porter, and instructed her to burn them should he be killed." In 1882 the U.S. Congress in a special bill awarded Eliza Porter a larger pension than normal due to her husband's death at the Little Bighorn.

Besides the marker at the Little Bighorn Battlefield, a family cenotaph memorial for Porter exists at the cemetery in his hometown of Strong, Maine which indicates his death at Custer's Last Stand, perhaps Maine's only monument to the battle. A large ceremony was held for Porter upon his death at the Congregational church in Strong, Maine. A coast artillery battery at Fort Hunt in Virginia was named in Porter's honor in 1903, and the James E. Porter Post of the Grand Army of the Republic in Weld, Maine in Porter's home county was named in his honor as well. One of Porter's personal Smith & Wesson revolvers that he carried while on duty is in the collections at Little Bighorn Battlefield National Monument.
