= Werner Henke =

German navy officer and World War II U-boat commander

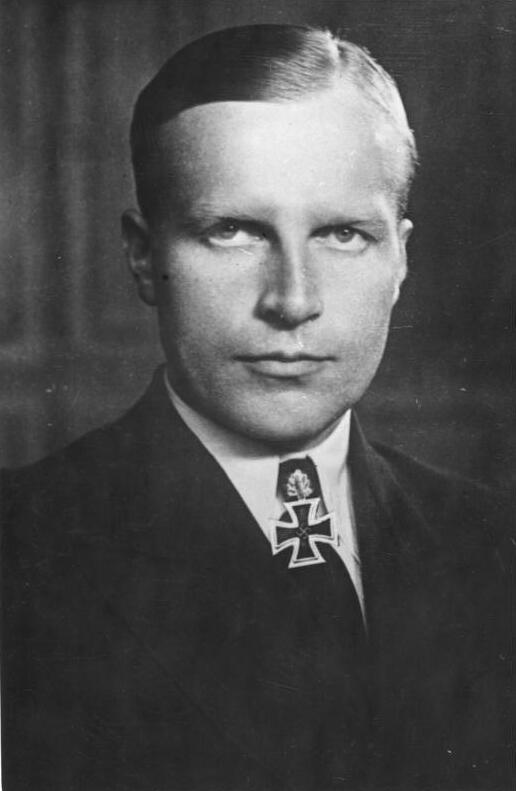
- Born: 13 May 1909; Rudak, Thorn, German Empire (today Poland)
- Died: 15 June 1944 (aged 35); Fort Hunt, Virginia, United States
- Burial place: Fort George G. Meade
- Military career
- Allegiance: Nazi Germany
- Branch: Reichsmarine; Kriegsmarine
- Service years: 1934–44
- Rank: Korvettenkapitän
- Units: 4th U-boat Flotilla; 10th U-boat Flotilla
- Commands: U-515
- Conflicts: Battle of the Atlantic
- Awards: Knight's Cross of the Iron Cross with Oak Leaves

Werner Henke (13 May 1909 – 15 June 1944) was the commander of German submarine U-515 in the Battle of the Atlantic of World War II. U-515 was sunk by the US task group 22.3, commanded by Daniel V. Gallery on 9 April 1944 and Henke was captured along with about 40 of his crew. He was shot and killed while attempting to escape from the POW interrogation center in Fort Hunt, Virginia in the United States.

== Early life and naval career ==
Henke was raised in Rudak, a small village just outside Thorn. When Thorn became part of Poland in 1920, the Henke family moved to Celle in the Province of Hanover. Henke joined the Reichsmarine in April 1934 after several years in the merchant marine.

Henke attended the Naval Academy at Mürwik and served on the pocket battleship German cruiser Admiral Scheer. In five years' training he spent only one week studying U-boat warfare. He spent nearly two years stationed at the Pillau (now Baltiysk) naval base starting in 1937. In May 1939 he was assigned to the battleship Schleswig-Holstein, where he participated in the first shots of World War II in the Battle of Westerplatte.

In April 1940, he commenced six weeks of training at the U-boat school at Neustadt in Holstein. Before completing this training however, he was convicted of desertion and sent to a punishment unit. In November, he was assigned to U-124.

== U-515 ==
In November 1941, he was sent to submarine commander's school, and on 21 February 1942 U-515 was commissioned with Henke in command.

Henke was captured when U-515 was sunk at 15:10 on 9 April 1944 in the mid-Atlantic north of Madeira at 34°35′N 19°18′W by bombs from the US escort carrier USS Guadalcanal and depth charges from the destroyer escorts USS Pope, USS Pillsbury, USS Chatelain and USS Flaherty. 40 survivors were taken on by the warships.

== Death ==
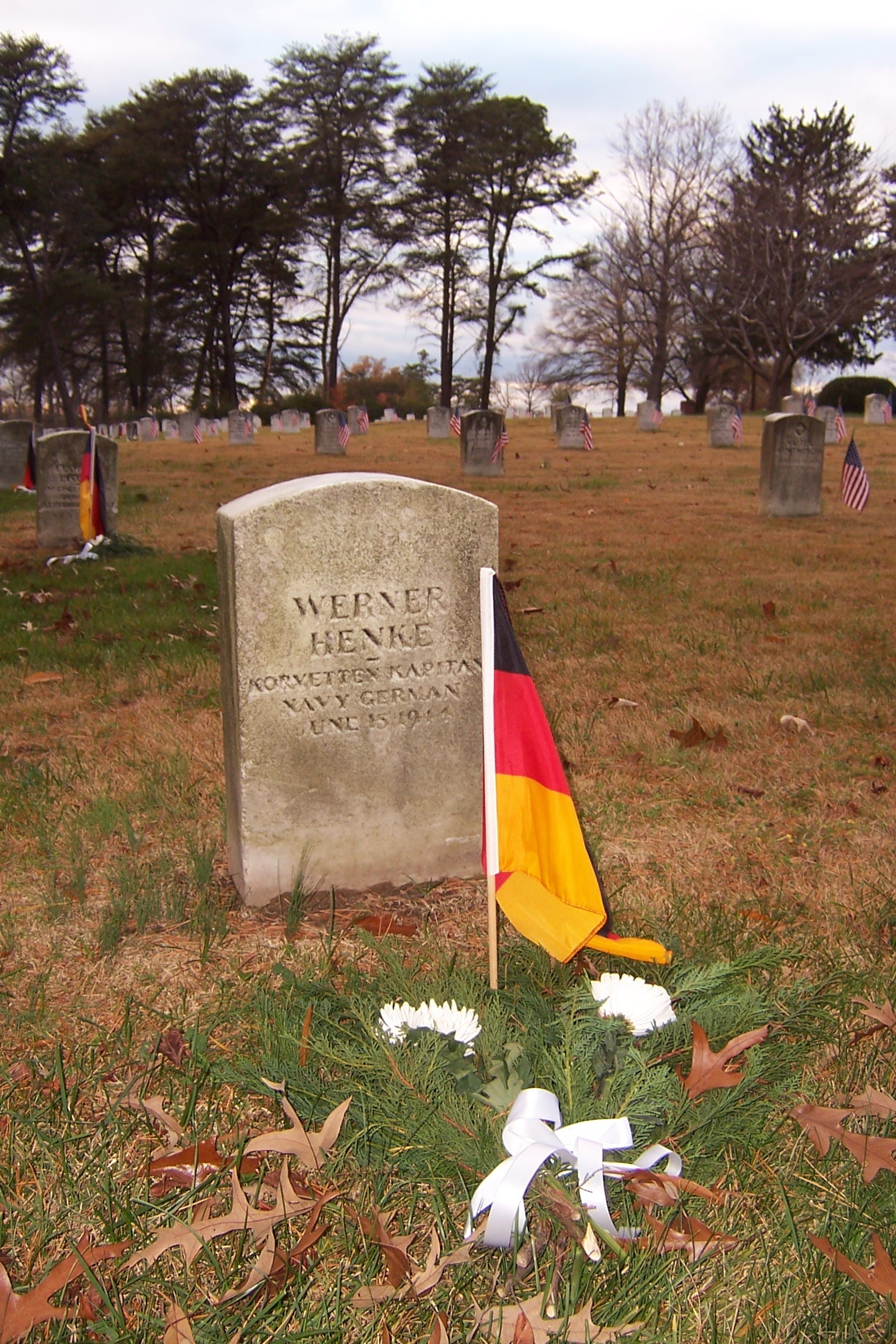
Werner Henke's grave at Fort Meade, MD, decorated for Volkstrauertag 2008

A British propaganda broadcast had accused Henke of shooting British survivors of Ceramic, a passenger ship that U-515 had sunk on 7 December 1942. Henke therefore believed the British wanted to try him as a war criminal. Knowing this, Captain Gallery, hoping to extort intelligence from him or his crew, threatened to turn him over to the British if he did not cooperate. Gallery was successful in getting Henke to sign a paper agreeing to cooperate with interrogators. Henke reneged on the agreement but upon seeing that their captain had agreed to talk, many of his crew signed similar agreements and did cooperate.

Henke was interned in the interrogation center known as P. O. Box 1142 in Fort Hunt, Virginia, where his interrogators threatened to hold him to his agreement to cooperate or be extradited to England to face war crimes charges. On 15 June 1944, he dashed to the fence of the interrogation center and began to climb over. He continued to climb after being ordered to stop and a guard shot him dead with a sub-machine gun.

== Aftermath ==
Henke was posthumously promoted to Korvettenkapitän and is interred at The Post Cemetery in Fort George G. Meade, Maryland, along with 32 other German POWs and 3 Italian POWs.

A ceremony is held at the gravesite every year on Volkstrauertag in November, the German equivalent of Memorial Day, at which the Naval attaché of the German embassy in Washington, DC, lays a wreath with a ribbon in the colors of the German flag in commemoration of all those buried at this gravesite. It is not uncommon to see flowers in front of the grave.

== Awards ==
- Wehrmacht Long Service Award 4th Class (1 October 1936)
- Spanish Cross in Bronze (6 June 1939)
- Sudetenland Medal (23 October 1940)
- Iron Cross (1939) 2nd Class (17 September 1939) & 1st Class (4 October 1941)
- U-boat War Badge (1939) (4 May 1941)
- Knight's Cross of the Iron Cross with Oak Leaves
  - Knight's Cross on 17 December 1942 as Oberleutnant zur See zur Verwendung and commander of U-515
  - 257th Oak Leaves on 4 July 1943 as Kapitänleutnant zur Verwendung and commander of U-515
