= Fort Hunt Park =

Public park in Fairfax County, Virginia, US

- Fort Hunt
- U.S. National Register of Historic Places
- U.S. Historic district
- Virginia Landmarks Register
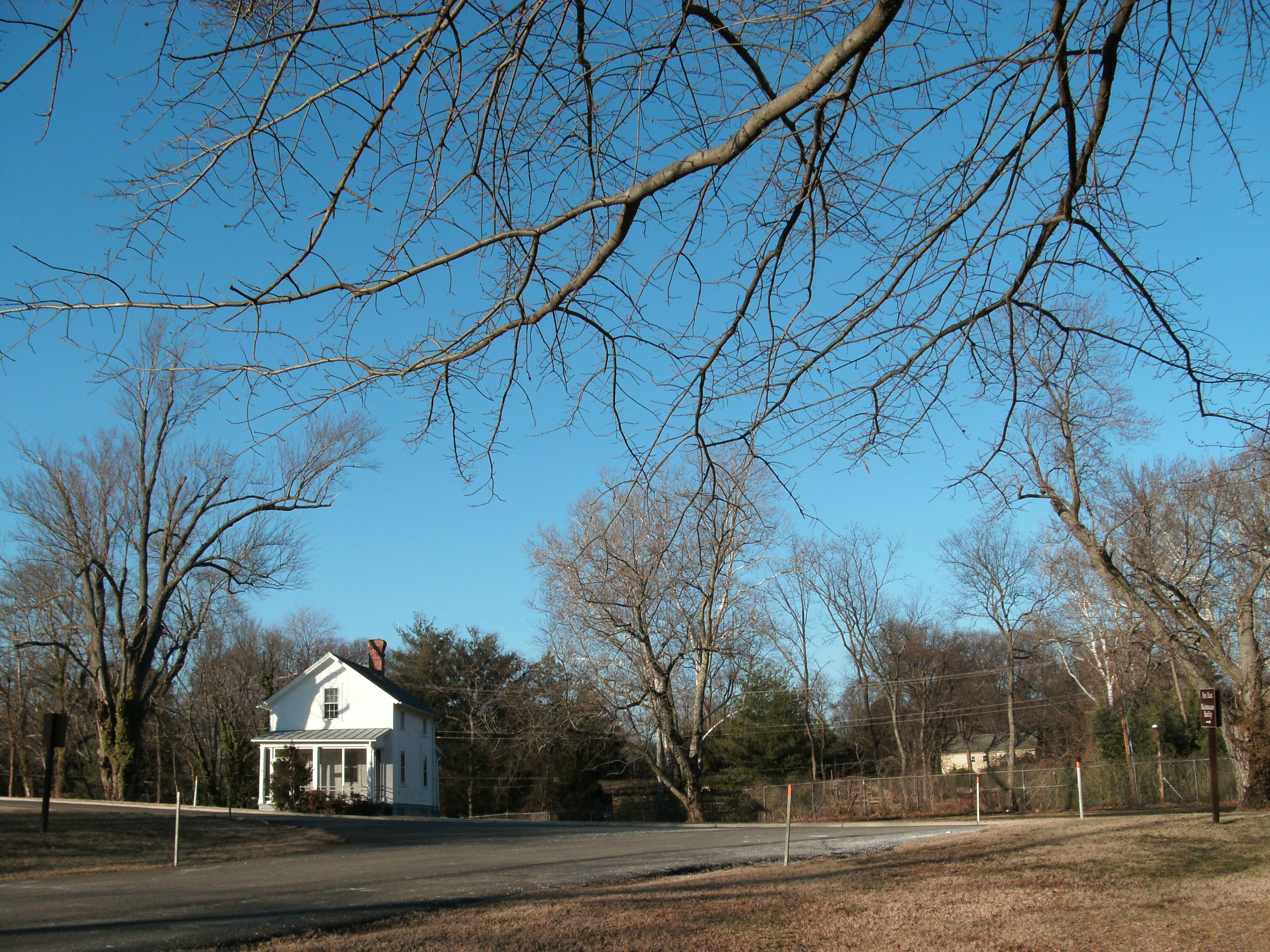
- Entrance to the park

- Location within Virginia Location within the United States
- Location: Mount Vernon Memorial Hwy., Alexandria, Virginia
- Coordinates: 38°42′53″N 77°03′11″W
- Area: 136 acres (55 ha)
- Built: 1897
- Built by: U.S. Army
- Architectural style: Endicott system
- Website: Fort Hunt Park
- NRHP reference No.: 80000353
- VLR No.: 029-0103

Significant dates
- Added to NRHP: March 26, 1980
- Designated VLR: December 18, 1979

Fort Hunt Park is a public park located in Fort Hunt, Fairfax County, Virginia. It is administered by the National Park Service as part of the George Washington Memorial Parkway. The park preserves the remains of the eponymous Fort Hunt, portions of which date to the time of the Spanish–American War. The park was named after Brigadier General Henry Hunt, who served as chief of artillery of the Army of the Potomac during the Civil War.

Remains of several of the fort's original batteries, including Battery Mount Vernon, Battery Robinson, and Battery Sater, and Battery Porter (named after Lt. James Porter, an officer who was killed at Custer's Last Stand at the Little Bighorn.), have been preserved, and may still be visited today. The structures have been stabilized enough that visitors are able to climb on them without difficulty. Besides the batteries, the battery commander's station still stands; in addition, a flagpole has been erected as a memorial to the intelligence officers who served at the fort during World War II.

Fort Hunt Park is open from dawn until dusk, year-round; access is from the George Washington Memorial Parkway or from Fort Hunt Road.

== History ==
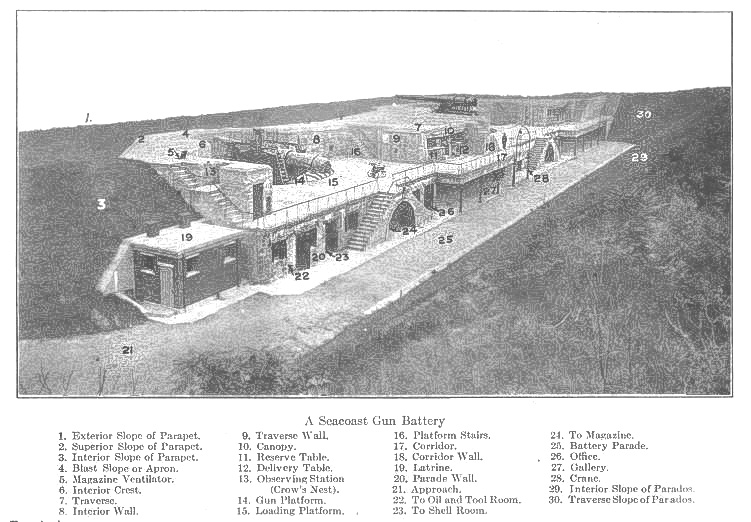
Typical seacoast battery circa 1910, similar to those at Fort Hunt

Fort Hunt is located along the Potomac River just 11 miles south of Washington, D. C. Its proximity to the Nation's capital dramatically affected the land use history. What occurred on this site frequently mirrored the political and social history of the United States. The site began its existence as a portion of George Washington's River Farm; though it passed out of Washington's family's hands around the beginning of the 19th century, it remained farmland until not long after the American Civil War. A fort was constructed on the site as part of a plan, developed in the 1880s, to expand and strengthen fortifications around the city of Washington. Fort Hunt was planned to complement Fort Washington, located just across the Potomac River in Maryland, and was completed in time for the Spanish–American War, though it did not see action in that conflict. The park was named after Brig. Gen. Henry Hunt, who served as chief of artillery of the Army of the Potomac during the Civil War. On June 11, 1932 General Douglas MacArthur established a field hospital at Fort Hunt to serve military veterans known as Bonus Marchers who were camped in the Anacostia and Hains Point areas of the District of Columbia. In the 1930s the site was converted into a Civilian Conservation Corps camp. During World War II it was the setting for top secret World War II military intelligence operations (known as "P.O. Box 1142") as well as an interrogation center for high-value prisoners of war. At one time the United States Army ran a school of finance there, but this did not last long. Today, the park is a popular picnic and jogging area. A playground and sports facilities are also available, and the United States Park Police man a substation at the park, as well as stables for their police horses.

Lieutenant Commander Werner Henke, the highest-ranking German officer to be shot while in American captivity during World War II, was killed while attempting an escape from Fort Hunt in June 1944. He was later buried in the post cemetery on Fort Meade, Maryland. In 1980, the remaining structures at the site were added to the National Register of Historic Places as the Fort Hunt Historic District.

The surrounding community of Fort Hunt, Virginia takes its name from the original fort.

== Gallery ==
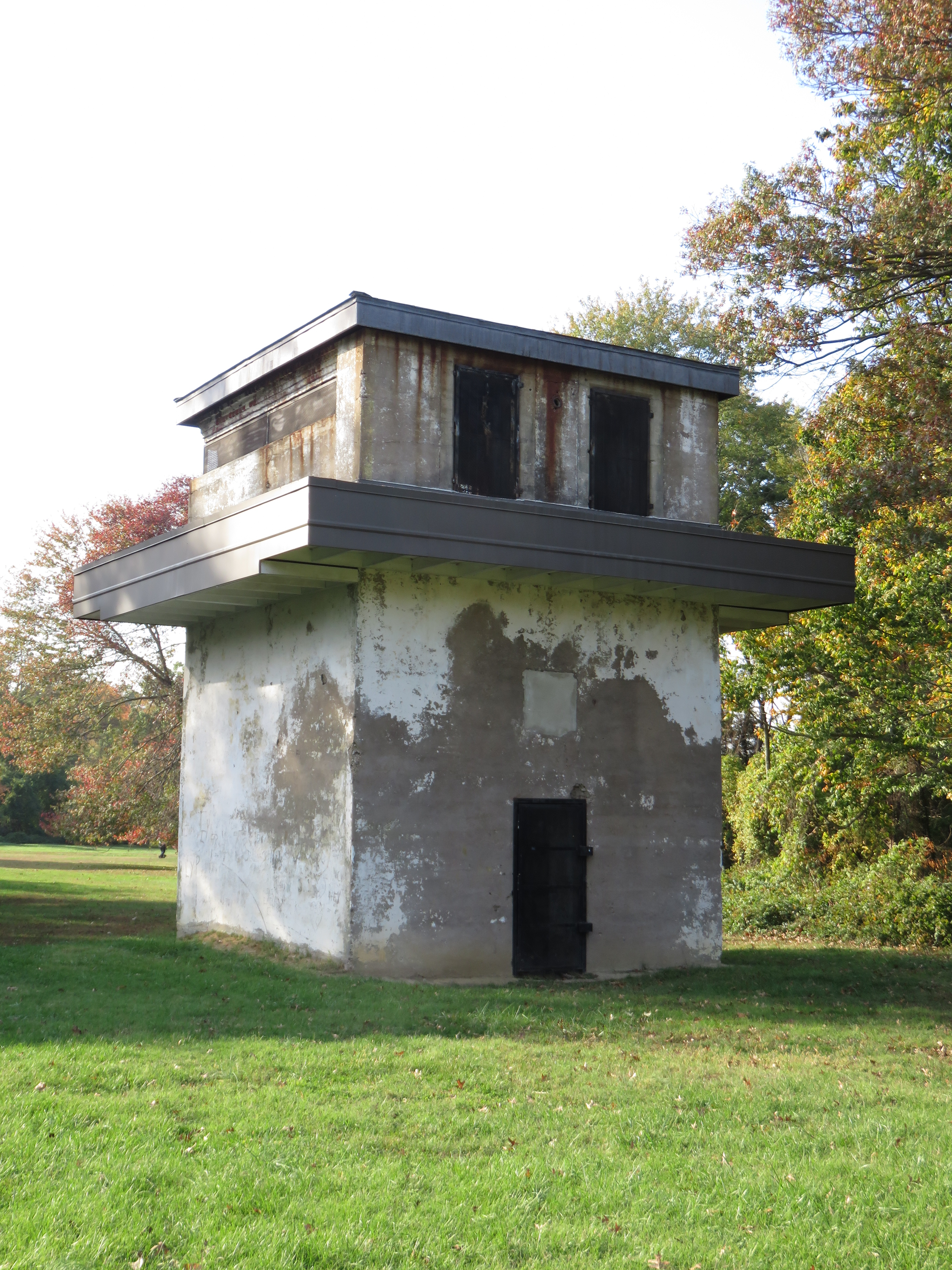
Commander's Station

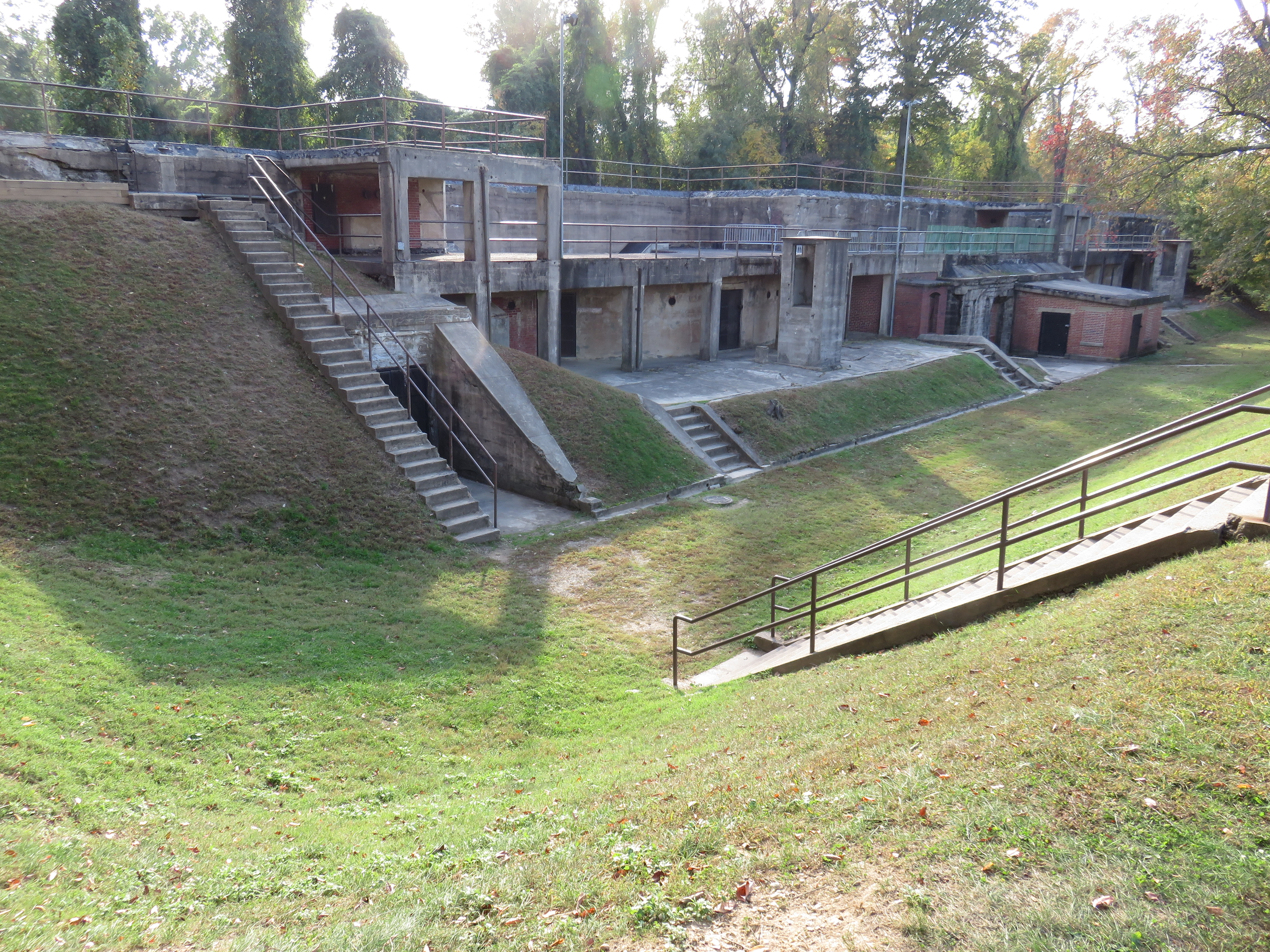
Battery Mount Vernon

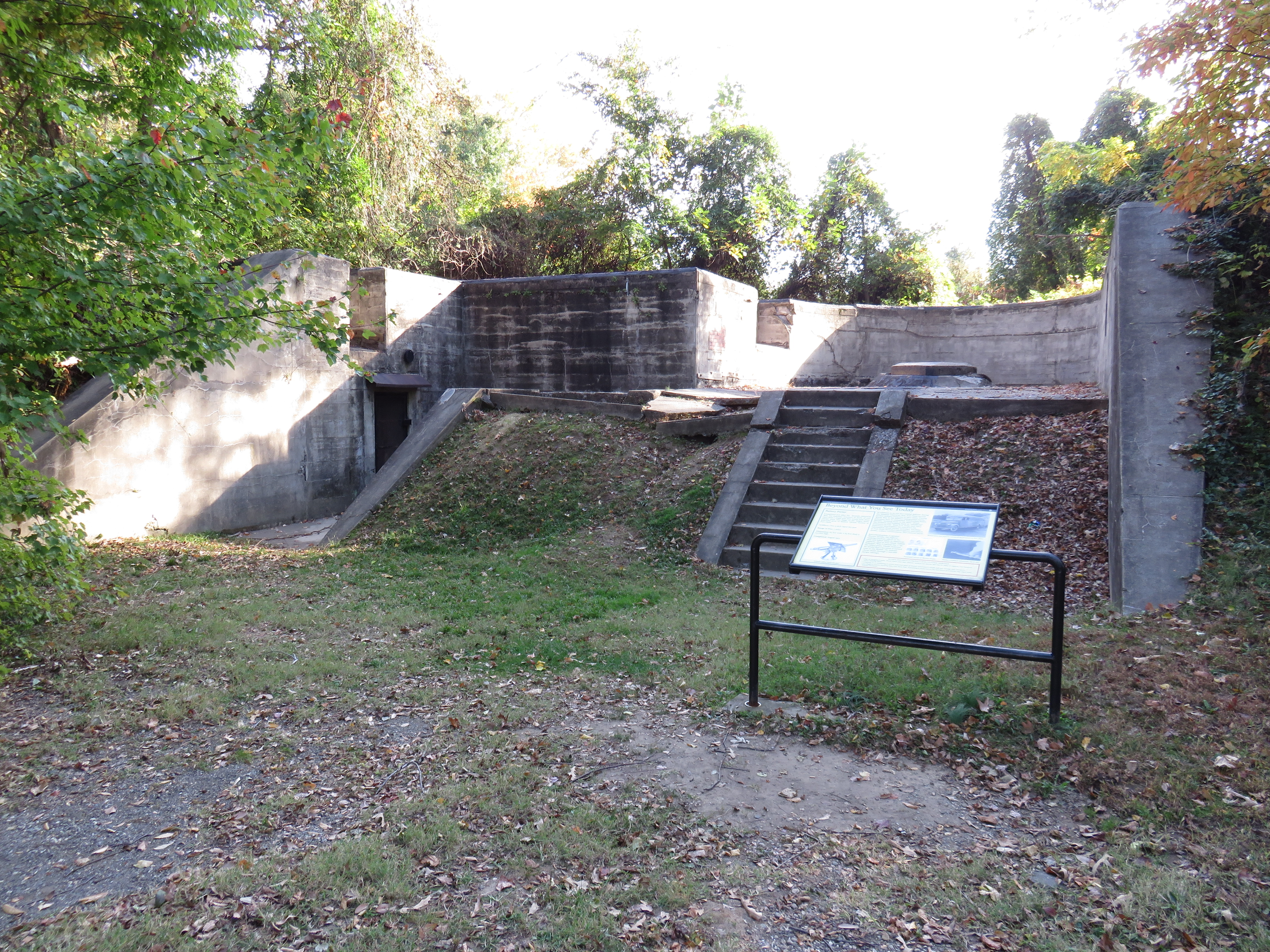
Battery Porter

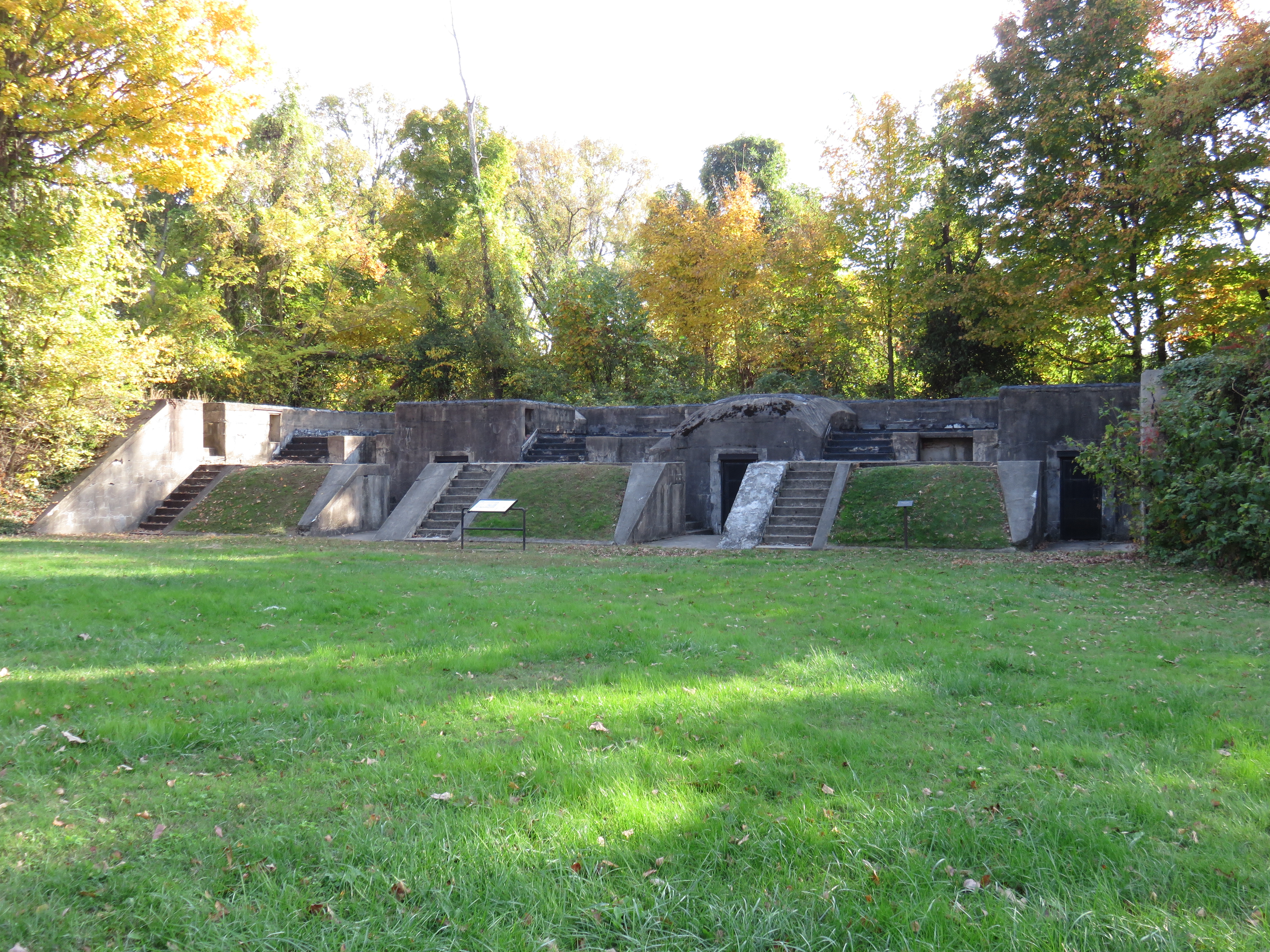
Battery Sater

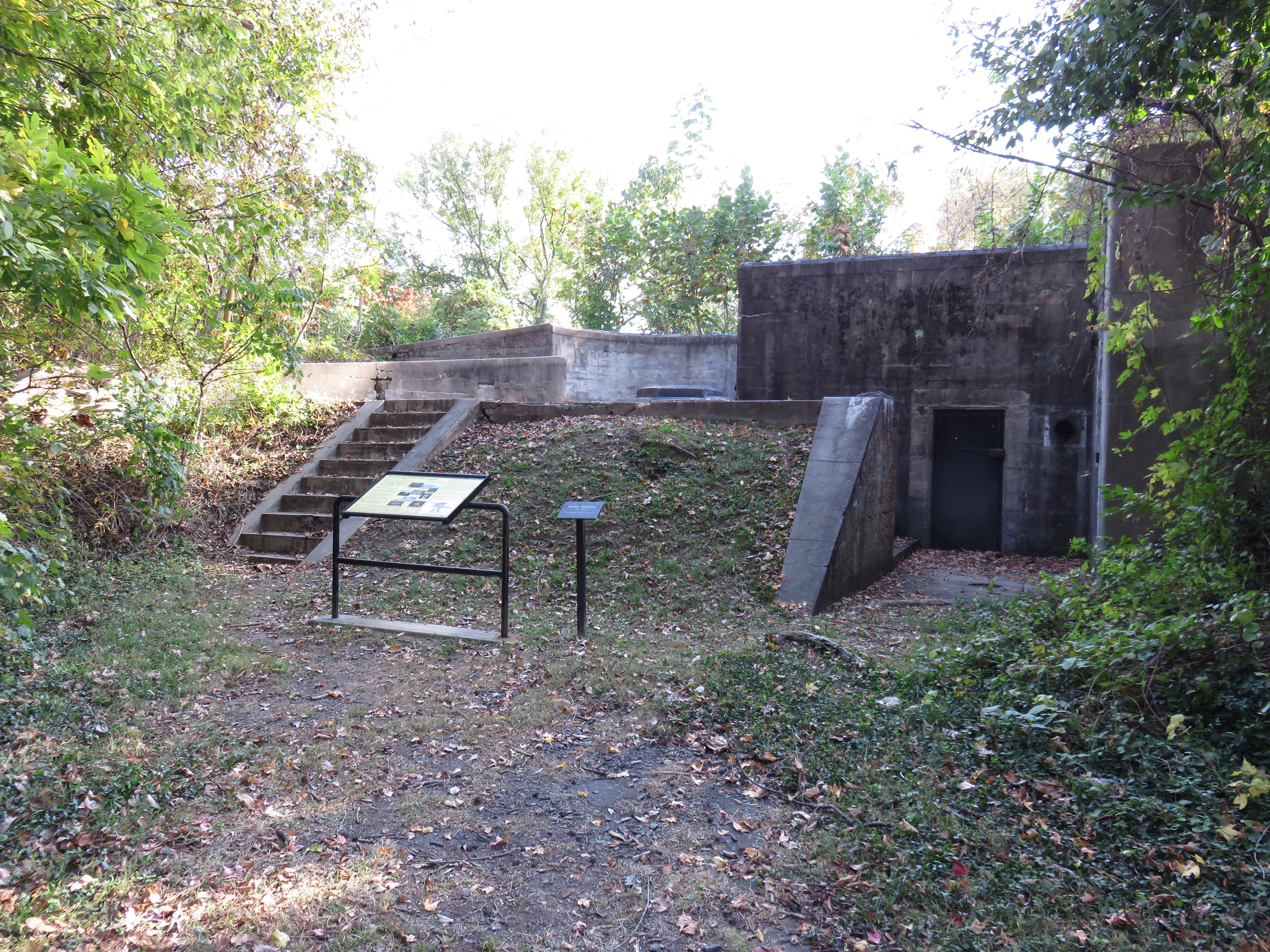
Battery Robinson
