= P. O. Box 1142 =

Former secret American military intelligence facility

Coordinates: 38.714722°N 77.053056°W

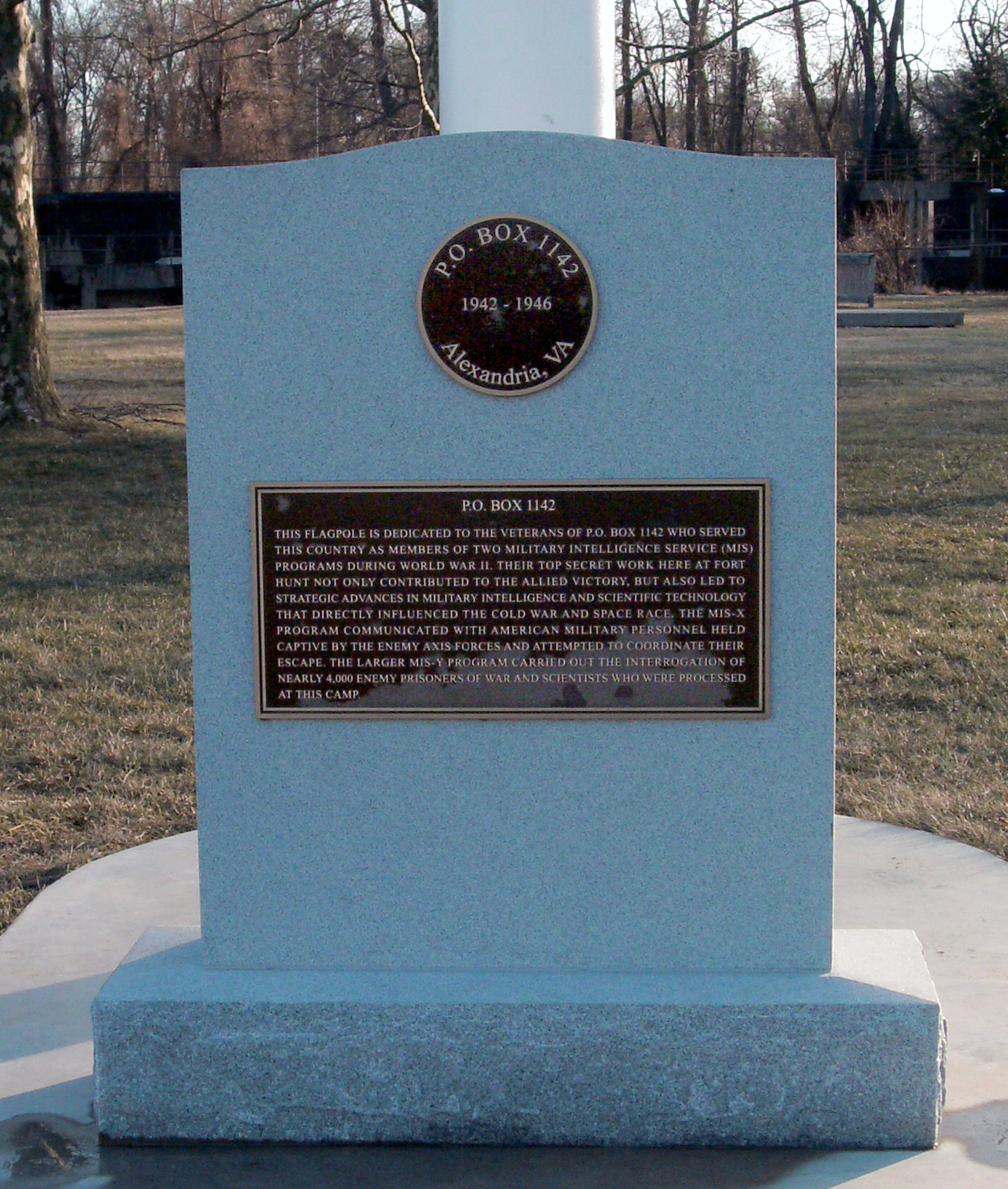
Memorial to P. O. Box 1142 at Fort Hunt Park

P.O. Box 1142 was a secret American military intelligence facility that operated during World War II. The American Military Intelligence Service had two special wings, known as MIS-X and MIS-Y.

The MIS-X program focused upon assisting the escape and evasion activities of American Prisoners of War (POWs) held by the Germans in Europe.

MIS-Y's core duty was to interview German POWs. They were known by their codename, the mailing address "P.O. Box 1142." Many of the interrogators were Jewish immigrants who had fled Germany as children. These men were chosen due to their understanding of the German language and culture as well as their personal interest in defeating the Nazis.

Notable prisoners housed at the facility included rocket scientist Wernher von Braun, spymaster Reinhard Gehlen, and Heinz Schlicke, inventor of infrared detection. German U-boat commander Werner Henke was also a prisoner, but was fatally shot when he tried to escape by climbing the fence.

P.O. Box 1142 was started in 1942 based in Fort Hunt, Virginia, formerly part of George Washington's farmlands. German scientists, submariners and soldiers were questioned. P.O. Box 1142 obtained valuable intelligence from German POWs and also communicated with Allied POWs overseas. The camp was in violation of the Geneva Conventions because the Red Cross was not notified of the transfer or location of the prisoners, but according to the surviving wardens, torture was not used.

The work done at Fort Hunt contributed to the Allied victory of World War II. It also led to advances in scientific technology and military intelligence that directly influenced the Cold War. In 1946 the 100 barracks, ringed by barbed wire and watch towers, were bulldozed, and the existence revealed to the public only in the early 2000s, when the National Park Service uncovered parts of the fort's history. In October 2007, a group of the former intelligence workers gathered for the first time since the war's conclusion, and a flagpole and plaque recognizing their contributions were dedicated on the original grounds.

== Commanders ==
The post commanders were:

- Col. Daniel W. Kent (1 July 1942 – 21 October 1942)
- Col. Russell H. Sweet (21 October 1942 – 1 February 1943)
- Col. John L. Walker (1 February 1943 – 18 July 1945)
- Col. Zenas R. Bliss (18 July 1945 – September 1945)

== Operation Paperclip ==
P.O. Box 1142 was one of a number of secret internment facilities commissioned by the United States with the goal to exploit the German scientists recruited as part of Operation Paperclip in Europe. In order to prevent scientists specializing in rocket and other sensitive technologies from falling into Communist hands, the United States became determined to prevent the Soviet Union from seizing scientists with this information prior to the end of the war. The U.S. Joint Intelligence Objectives Agency was responsible for sponsoring the operation and took a specific focus on the scientists who had worked on Hitler's V2 Rocket program.

== Interrogation process ==
As many of the former prison guards and interrogators at P.O. Box 1142 have started to grow old and information became declassified, the substantial amount of intelligence learned at P.O. Box 1142 has started to come to light. Between 1942 and 1946, the military interrogators at the camp questioned more than 3,400 prisoners, more than 500 of whom were scientists who came to the United States as part of Operation Paperclip. During these interviews, significant information regarding German advances in rocketry, jet technology, weapons systems, and acoustic torpedoes was discovered. The United States was able to take this information and develop an effective acoustic torpedo countermeasure.

The former interrogators say they did not use physical torture, but they did use psychological tricks, like threatening to turn the prisoner over to the Soviets. National Park Service Ranger Brandon Bies interviewed over 70 former interrogators from P.O. Box 1142 on this topic and said: "To our knowledge, no. There was no torture here. This is a question that was asked in every interview the National Park Service conducted, and we have found no evidence that there was anything remotely resembling torture that happened here."

Russian American soldiers Alex Schidlovsky and Alexander Dallin would dress in Russian uniforms and they would attend the interrogations. We would play good cop, bad cop. If you want to talk, okay you can go to a nice POW camp in Fort Meade. Otherwise, you could go to the Soviet Union. And guess what they preferred?

— Rudy Pins, interrogator at Fort Hunt, Sutton, Robert K (2021). Nazis on the Potomac: The Top-Secret Intelligence Operation that Helped Win World War II. Philadelphia and Oxford: Casemate Publishers. p. 83. ISBN 978-1-61200-987-2.

During the many interrogations, I never laid hands on anyone. We extracted information in a battle of the wits. I'm proud to say I never compromised my humanity.

— George Frenkel, US interrogator, Dvorak, Petula (October 6, 2007). "Fort Hunt's Quiet Men Break Silence on WWII". Washington Post.

== Later reception ==
In 2001, the German historian Sönke Neitzel found about 150,000 pages of interrogation reports and bugged room conversations made in Trent Park and Fort Hunt. He analysed them together with Harald Welzer, a social psychologist. They published several books about their results:

- Abgehört: Deutsche Generäle in britischer Kriegsgefangenschaft 1942–1945. Ullstein, Berlin 2005 (edited by Neitzel) [English: Tapping Hitler's Generals: Transcripts of Secret Conversations, 1942–1945. Frontline Books, 2007. ISBN 978-1844157051.
- »Der Führer war wieder viel zu human, viel zu gefühlvoll«: Der Zweite Weltkrieg aus der Sicht deutscher und italienischer Soldaten (2011) (edited by Neitzel, Welzer and Christian Gudehus). [English: "The Führer was again far too humane, far too sensitive": The Second World War from the perspective of German and Italian soldiers]. ISBN 9783596188727
- Soldaten. Protokolle vom Kämpfen, Töten und Sterben. S. Fischer, Frankfurt am Main 2011 (written by Neitzel and Welzer) [English: Soldaten: On Fighting, Killing and Dying. Simon & Schuster, 2012]. ISBN 9781849839501
- Another member of the research group, Felix Römer, wrote Kameraden. Die Wehrmacht von innen. Piper, Munich, 2012. ISBN 3492304176

== See also ==
- Byron Hot Springs § Camp Tracy, similar camp for Japanese and German POWs
- MI9, the British equivalent of MIS-X
