= James W. Porter (ecologist) =

American ecologist

James Watson Porter (born 5 October 1946) is an American ecologist.

Porter was raised in Ohio, near Lake Erie, and graduated from Mercersburg Academy in Mercersburg, Pennsylvania. He earned an undergraduate and doctoral degree from Yale University in 1969 and 1973, respectively. Porter started his teaching career at the University of Michigan in 1972, and remained on the faculty until 1977, when he joined the University of Georgia faculty. Between 1977 and 1981, Porter was chief editor of the journals Ecology and Ecological Monographs. Porter held the Josiah Meigs Distinguished Professorship at the University of Georgia, and was granted emeritus status upon his retirement.

In 1983, Porter was elected to fellowship of the American Association for the Advancement of Science. He was awarded the Eugene P. Odum Award for Excellence in Ecology Education by the Ecological Society of America in 2005. In 2012, the Ecological Society of America awarded him fellow status.
