= Fort Hunt, Virginia =

- Census-designated place
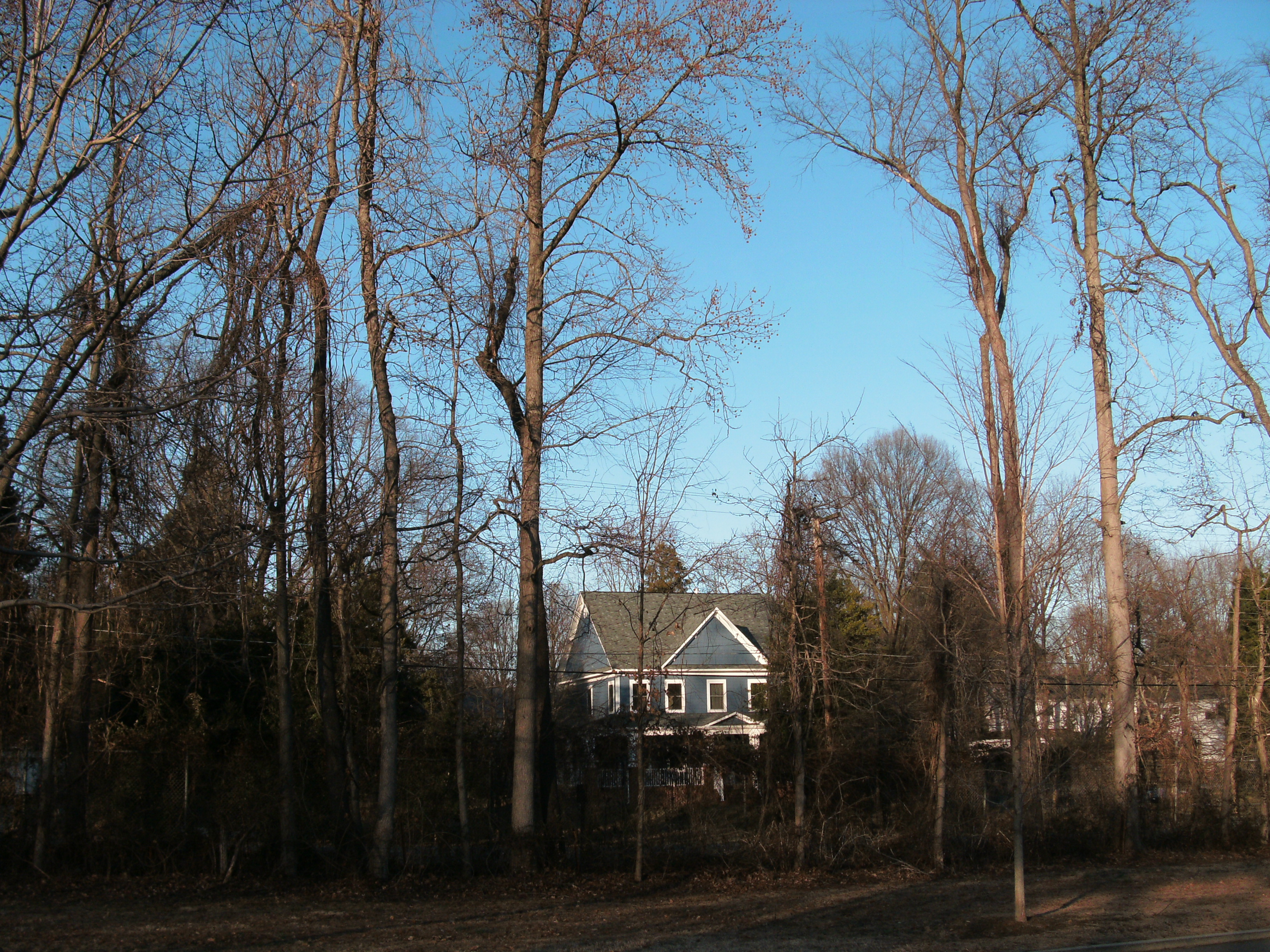
- Houses along Fort Hunt Rd., seen from Fort Hunt Park

- Location of Fort Hunt in Fairfax County, Virginia

- Location within Northern Virginia Location within Virginia Location within the United States
- Coordinates: 38°43′58″N 77°3′29″W
- Country: United States
- State: Virginia
- County: Fairfax

Area
  - Total: 6.27 sq mi (16.23 km^{2})
  - Land: 5.85 sq mi (15.16 km^{2})
  - Water: 0.41 sq mi (1.07 km^{2})
- Elevation: 33 ft (10 m)

Population (2020)
  - Total: 17,231
  - Density: 2,750/sq mi (1,061.7/km^{2})
- Time zone: UTC−5 (Eastern (EST))
  - Summer (DST): UTC−4 (EDT)
- ZIP code: 22308
- FIPS code: 51-29136
- GNIS feature ID: 1867588

Fort Hunt is a census-designated place (CDP) in Fairfax County, Virginia, United States. The area is named after Fort Hunt, which was built on the bank of the Potomac River in 1897 to defend Washington, D.C. from naval attack and is now a public park. The area is also notable for its high population of senior citizens and for being one of the first suburbs in wealthy Fairfax County. The population was 17,231 at the 2020 census.

Fort Hunt encompasses the 22308 ZIP code of Alexandria, composed of much of the most affluent section of southeast Fairfax County, close to the George Washington Memorial Parkway and Potomac River, including the neighborhoods of Riverside Gardens, Tauxemont, Herbert Springs, Waynewood, Plymouth Haven, Potomac Valley – River Bend, Collingwood, Stratford Landing, Stratford on the Potomac, Hollin Hall, Wellington, Arcturus and (in ZIP code 22307) Villamay and Marlan Forest. As of the 2010 census, Fort Hunt also includes the neighborhood of Hollindale in ZIP code 22306 and much of Hollin Hills in 22307. Prominent Fort Hunt residents include U.S. Senator Tim Johnson, former House Speaker Bob Livingston and Supreme Court Justice Samuel Alito.

== Geography ==
Fort Hunt is located in southeastern Fairfax County at 38°43′58″N 77°3′29″W (38.732814, −77.058066). It is bordered to the south and east by the Potomac River, which forms the Maryland state line. Neighboring Virginia CDPs are Belle Haven to the north, Groveton to the northwest, Hybla Valley to the west, and Mount Vernon to the southwest across Little Hunting Creek. According to the United States Census Bureau, the Fort Hunt CDP has a total area of 6.3 square miles (16.2 km^{2}), of which 5.9 square miles (15.2 km^{2}) is land and 0.42 square miles (1.1 km^{2}), or 6.59%, is water.

Located within Fort Hunt is Fort Hunt Park, currently operated by the National Park Service, with a history of military activity dating from 1676.

== History ==
The site of present-day Fort Hunt Park was used as an asset for the United States military beginning in the Spanish–American War. The fort had been completed on land that used to belong to the River Farm plantation of George Washington. The fort was used to complement Fort Washington across the river in Maryland, but it was not involved in an actual battle during the Spanish–American War.

During World War II, the fort was used as an interrogation center called P. O. Box 1142 where captive German officers were kept and questioned. Fort Hunt is the site of the death of Lieutenant Commander Werner Henke, the highest-ranking German officer to be shot while in American captivity during World War II.

During the war and after, neighborhoods such as Waynewood and Snowden began arising in the area around the fort, and the commercial center for the community, Hollin Hall shopping center, was constructed on Fort Hunt Road.

== Demographics ==
Historical population
Census	Pop.	Note	%±
2000	12,923		—
2010	16,045		24.2%
2020	17,231		7.4%
U.S. Decennial Census; 2010 2020

=== Racial and ethnic composition ===
Fort Hunt CDP, Virginia – Racial and ethnic composition Note: the US Census treats Hispanic/Latino as an ethnic category. This table excludes Latinos from the racial categories and assigns them to a separate category. Hispanics/Latinos may be of any race.
Race / Ethnicity (NH = Non-Hispanic)	Pop 2000	Pop 2010	Pop 2020	% 2000	% 2010	% 2020
White alone (NH)	11,739	14,184	14,204	90.84%	88.40%	82.43%
Black or African American alone (NH)	304	359	356	2.35%	2.24%	2.07%
Native American or Alaska Native alone (NH)	20	22	23	0.15%	0.14%	0.13%
Asian alone (NH)	323	437	515	2.50%	2.72%	2.99%
Native Hawaiian or Pacific Islander alone (NH)	6	9	14	0.05%	0.06%	0.08%
Other race alone (NH)	26	20	99	0.20%	0.12%	0.57%
Mixed race or Multiracial (NH)	163	316	849	1.26%	1.97%	4.93%
Hispanic or Latino (any race)	342	698	1,171	2.65%	4.35%	6.80%
Total	12,923	16,045	17,231	100.00%	100.00%	100.00%

=== 2020 census ===
As of the 2020 census, Fort Hunt had a population of 17,231. The median age was 43.6 years. 27.5% of residents were under the age of 18 and 18.1% of residents were 65 years of age or older. For every 100 females there were 97.6 males, and for every 100 females age 18 and over there were 94.4 males age 18 and over.

100.0% of residents lived in urban areas, while 0.0% lived in rural areas.

There were 5,967 households in Fort Hunt, of which 41.5% had children under the age of 18 living in them. Of all households, 73.4% were married-couple households, 8.3% were households with a male householder and no spouse or partner present, and 15.6% were households with a female householder and no spouse or partner present. About 15.1% of all households were made up of individuals and 9.5% had someone living alone who was 65 years of age or older.

There were 6,162 housing units, of which 3.2% were vacant. The homeowner vacancy rate was 0.6% and the rental vacancy rate was 1.9%.

=== Demographic estimates ===
According to 2022 American Community Survey data, the population density was 2,748.2 inhabitants per square mile (1,061.7/km^{2}), and the average housing unit density was 982.8 per square mile (379.7/km^{2}).

In the CDP, 21.6% of residents reported English ancestry, 10.7% spoke a language other than English at home, and 8.0% were born outside the United States, 76.4% of whom were naturalized citizens.

=== Income and poverty ===
The median income for a household in the CDP was $209,135, and the median income for a family was $234,343. 15.2% of the population were military veterans, and 79% had a bachelor's degree or higher. In the CDP, 1.8% of the population was below the poverty line, including 1.1% of those under age 18 and 2.7% of those age 65 or over, and 1.8% of the population was without health insurance.

=== 2010 census ===
The population was 16,045 at the 2010 census.

=== 2000 census ===
As of the census of 2000, there were 12,923 people, 4,974 households, and 3,909 families residing in the CDP. The population density was 2,538.9 inhabitants per square mile (980.3/km^{2}). There were 5,050 housing units at an average density of 992.2 per square mile (383.1/km^{2}). The racial makeup of the CDP was 92.83% White, 2.37% African American, 0.17% Native American, 2.56% Asian, 0.05% Pacific Islander, 0.49% from other races, and 1.53% from two or more races. Hispanic or Latino of any race were 2.65% of the population.

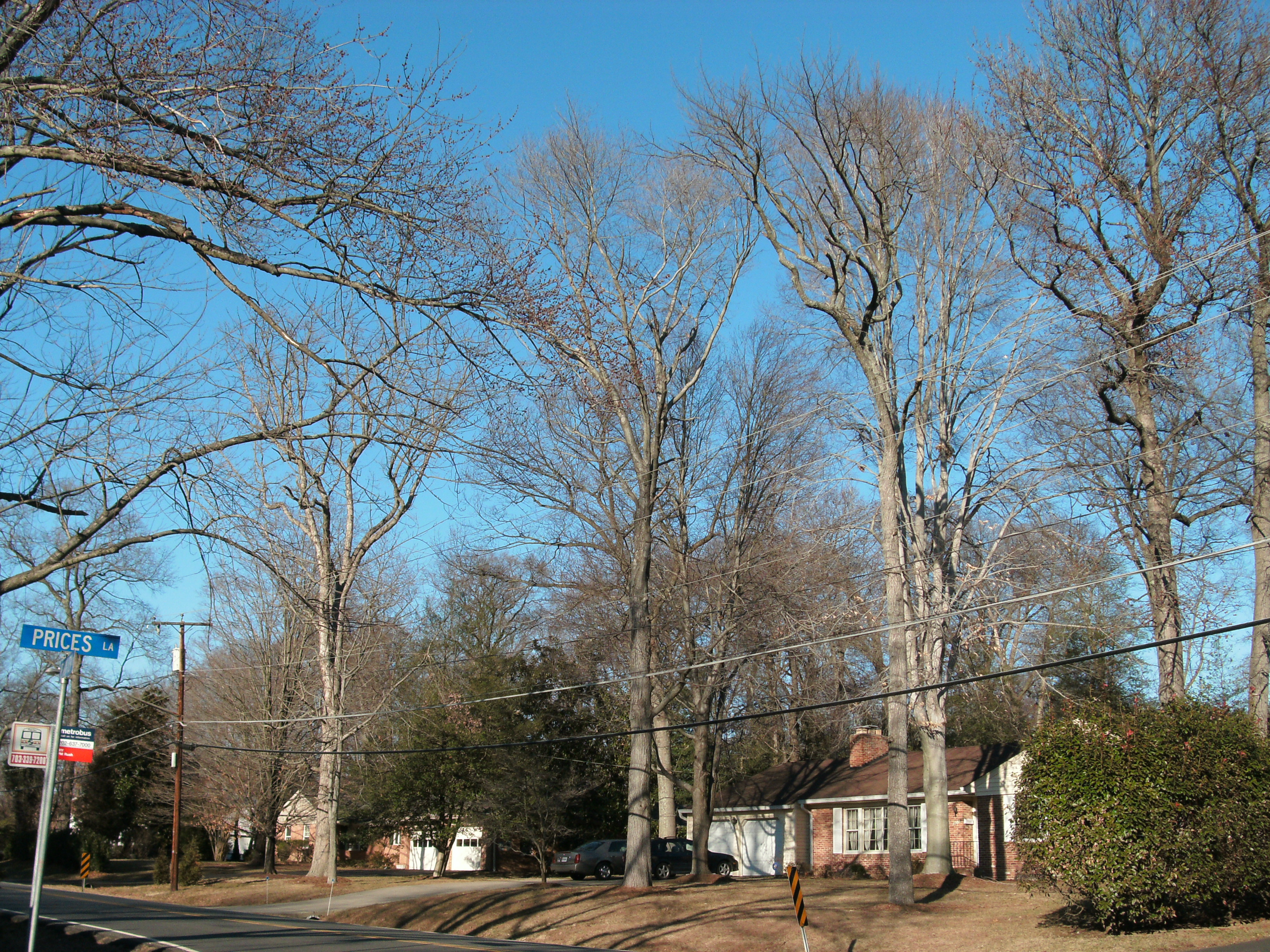
Houses in Fort Hunt

There were 4,974 households, out of which 33.0% had children under the age of 18 living with them, 71.2% were married couples living together, 5.6% had a female householder with no husband present, and 21.4% were non-families. 17.9% of all households were made up of individuals, and 9.4% had someone living alone who was 65 years of age or older. The average household size was 2.58 and the average family size was 2.94.

In the CDP, the population was spread out, with 24.8% under the age of 18, 2.8% from 18 to 24, 23.2% from 25 to 44, 30.1% from 45 to 64, and 19.1% who were 65 years of age or older. The median age was 45 years. For every 100 females, there were 94.4 males. For every 100 females age 18 and over, there were 90.6 males.

The median income for a household in the CDP was $102,259, and the median income for a family was $111,935. Males had a median income of $79,828 versus $53,654 for females. The per capita income for the CDP was $46,957. About 1.0% of families and 1.8% of the population were below the poverty line, including 1.6% of those under age 18 and 1.5% of those age 65 or over.
