= Charles Goodman (disambiguation) =

Charles M. Goodman (1906–1992) was an American architect.

Charles Goodman may also refer to:

- Charles Davis Goodman (1894–1962), Jewish-Canadian architect
- Charles M. Goodman House, historic home located at Alexandria, Virginia
- Rusty Goodman (Charles F. Goodman, 1933–1990), singer/songwriter
- Charles Goodman Tebbutt (1860–1944), English speedskater and bandy player
- Chip Goodman (Atlas/Seaboard Comics), Atlas/Seaboard Comics#Chip Goodman Marvel's editorial director

== See also ==
- Charles Goldman (disambiguation)
