= Alcoa Care-free Homes =

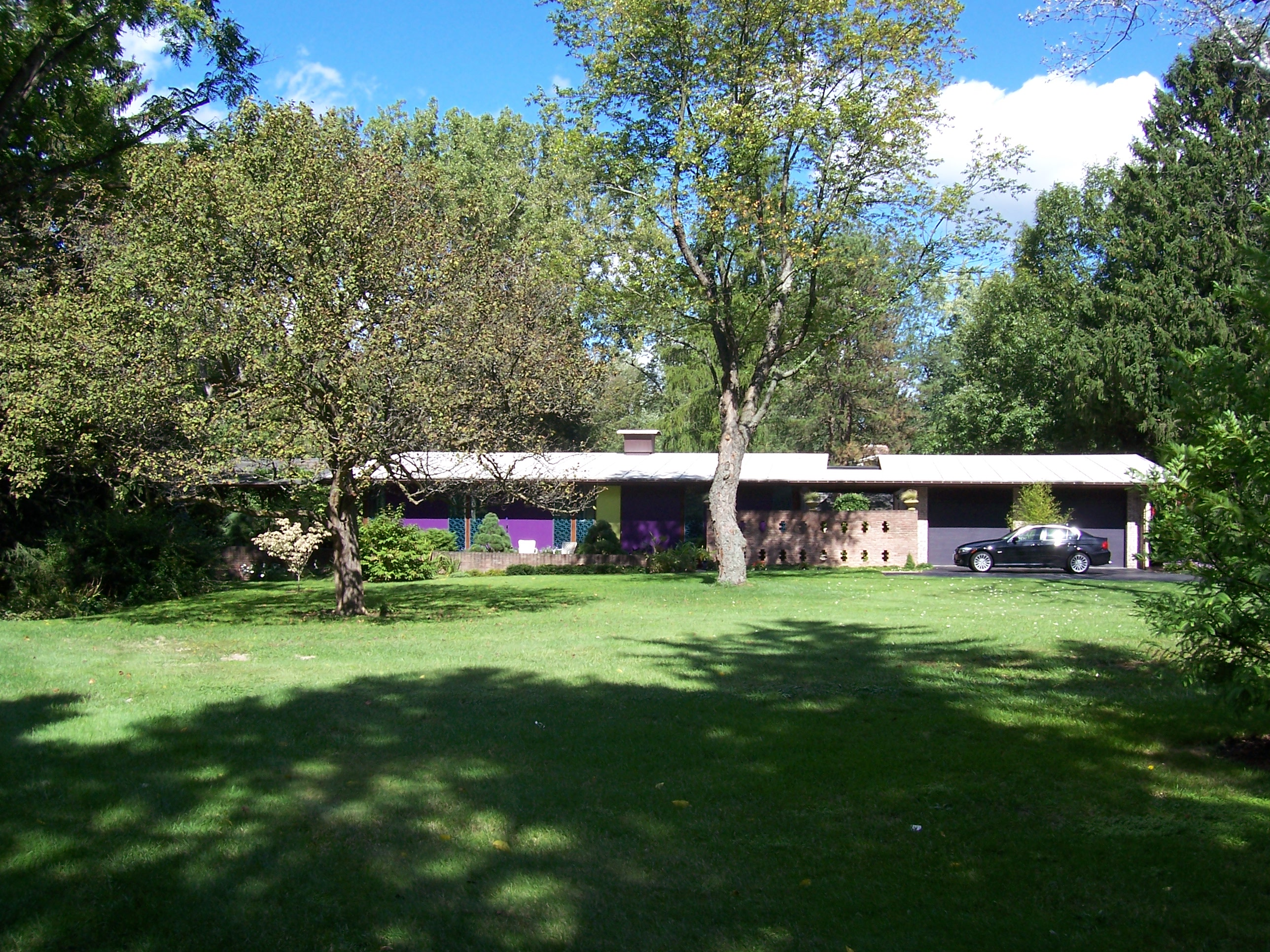
The Alcoa Care-free Home in New York State

Alcoa Care-free Homes are a group of suburban homes designed for Alcoa (Aluminum Company of America) by Charles M. Goodman during the Mid-century modern movement, incorporating ideas generated at the Women's Congress On Housing.

While composed of a variety of building materials (brick, steel, wood, and extensive use of glass) they incorporated large amounts (up to 7500 lbs) of aluminum. The homes were introduced in 1957. They were constructed by local contractors using kits provided by Alcoa, and were mostly built in 1958 as model homes. The company had intended to build forty-eight homes, one for each state in union at the time. Eventually, twenty-four were built in sixteen states. The company was sued for misrepresentation of costs to build the homes, with ALCOA claiming costs to build up to $34,000 and selling prices of $50,000 while Associated Contractors Inc., claiming true costs to build the homes were $63,612 with the highest selling price $32,419.

== Locations ==
According to the original brochure, an Alcoa Care-Free Home was built in the following places:

- Lakewood, Colorado, (outside Denver)
- New Canaan, Connecticut
- Pinecrest, Florida (outside Miami)
- Evansville, Illinois
- Wheaton, Illinois
- Lafayette, Indiana - the first Alcoa house to be built
- Lincoln, Massachusetts (outside Boston
- Southfield, Michigan (outside Birmingham)
- Flint, Michigan
- Grand Rapids, Michigan
- Saint Louis Park, Minnesota (outside Minneapolis) restored
- Brighton, New York (outside Rochester 43°7′38.64″N 77°32′49.27″W) - Alcoa Care-free Home added to the NRHP
- Brecksville, Ohio (outside Cleveland)
- Dublin, Ohio (outside Columbus)
- Woodbourne-Hyde Park, Ohio (outside Dayton)
- Perrysburg, Ohio (outside Toledo) - Built by Gustav H. Feldtmann, the house was open to visitors for a six-week period shortly after completion. He sold it in 1965.
- Raleigh Hills, Oregon (outside Portland) 45°28′54″N 122°45′14″W) - The house was demolished in September 2021, after being sold for $880,000 in December 2020.
- Upper St. Clair Township, Pennsylvania (outside Pittsburgh) - in a southern suburb of Alcoa’s corporate home
- Ross Township, Allegheny County, Pennsylvania (outside Pittsburgh)
- Maryville, Tennessee
- Fort Worth, Texas
- Alexandria, Virginia (Hollin Hills Historic District) contributing property the NRHP historic district - restored
- Richmond, Virginia
- Seattle, Washington

== See also ==
- Lustron house
- Charles M. Goodman House
- Case Study Houses
