= Charles Goldman =

Charles Goldman may refer to:

- Charles Goldman (conceptual artist), American conceptual artist
- Charles R. Goldman, American limnologist and ecologist

== See also ==
- Charles Goodman (disambiguation)
