= Green Machine / Blue Space =

Green Machine / Blue Space is the first solar hydrogen home. It was developed by NYIT and US Merchant Marine Academy. It is currently housed in US Merchant Marine Academy. It was built using a modified shipping container. It placed fifth in the Solar Decathlon.

== See also ==
- Alcoa Care-free Home, another experimental home in New York
