= University Town Center =

- New Town Center
- U.S. National Register of Historic Places
- U.S. Historic district
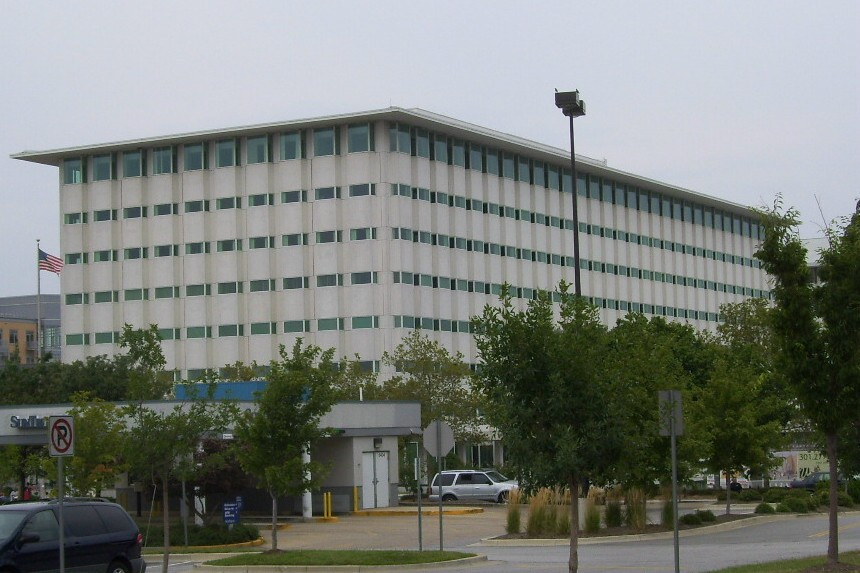
- Metro One office building designed by Edward Durell Stone (built 1963, renovated 1996) and located at University Town Center, Hyattsville, Maryland

- Location within Maryland Location within the United States
- Location: 6505 Belcrest Road ; 6525 Belcrest Road; 3700 East West Highway, Hyattsville, Maryland
- Coordinates: 38°58′04″N 76°57′10″W
- Area: 7.35 acres (2.97 ha)
- Built: 1962-1973
- Architectural style: Mid-Century Modern
- NRHP reference No.: 100002683
- Added to NRHP: October 23, 2018

University Town Center, formerly New Town Center, is located in Hyattsville, Maryland, United States. It was a planned urban center designed by Edward Durell Stone and located on a 105-acre (0.42 km^{2}) parcel at the intersection of Belcrest Road and East-West Highway and across from the then new Prince George's Plaza. The initial construction on this development took place in 1963–64; its buildings are listed on the National Register of Historic Places in 2018. A second phase commenced after the opening of the Hyattsville Crossing station, Washington Metro rapid transit station in 1993.

== Development ==
=== First phase ===
The $78 million project was developed by Bancroft Construction, headed by Herschel and Marvin Blumberg, who had originally purchased the site in 1954. The Blumberg brothers also developed the area of nearby Silver Spring, Maryland, now known as the Rock Creek Woods Historic District. The original $5.5 million, 300,000-square-foot (28,000 m^{2}) Federal office building (now known as Metro 1) was occupied in 1963 by the U.S. Department of Agriculture. Architect Stone referred to the development as a "Rockefeller Center in the countryside." Other original buildings were the high rise apartments Plaza Towers West and Plaza Towers East, located at Toledo Terrace and Belcrest Road. The Metro 2 office building was completed in 1968 and the Metro 3 building in 1971.

The original concept for the New Town Center was for it to be "a planned residential, commercial, employment and social complex which, as yet (1963) has no equal in the Baltimore-Washington area." The Blumberg brothers' plans included interlocking residential and commercial facilities including the separation of pedestrian and automobile traffic and the enhancement of open spaces by the use of sunken reflecting pools, fountains, and plantings. Also included in the 1964 plans were two more Stone-designed office buildings (built in 1968 and 1972), another apartment structure (not built), a 1,400 seat motion picture theater (not built), and a huge ice skating rink (not built). Most dramatic were plans for multiple 34-story apartment towers, which would have been among the tallest structures in the Washington, DC area. Plans were also included for a Youth Center (built at Toledo and Adelphi Roads) and a $1.3 million Prince George's County Cultural Center (not built). Transportation plans in 1964 called for a spur from I-95 to be built just west of the tract (not built) and for underground rapid transit service to serve the Federal Building. Parks, schools, churches, and recreational facilities (some built) were expected to form a transitional buffer between the new developments and the surrounding single-family homes, in University Park, Maryland.

New Town Center did not develop as fully or rapidly as originally envisioned. The expected I-95 extension through Northeast Washington and Maryland suburbs never occurred, effectively isolating the area. Development of the Washington Metro did not occur until the 1970s and the Green Line was the last segment developed in the main system. Finally, the changing demographic characteristics of Prince George's County to majority-minority during the 1980s and 1990s soured the area to many developers.

=== Second phase ===
However, interest in this area revived following the opening of the Prince George's Plaza Metro station in 1993. Still owned and controlled by Herschel Blumberg and renamed Prince George's Metro Center, the development was later renamed University Town Center when the National Center for Health Statistics (NCHS) in 2000 decided to lease new headquarters space at the site. NCHS had previously been a tenant in one of the original office buildings and moved to its new headquarters in 2002 in the building named Metro Four. In August 2006, a 16-story student apartment with 910 beds opened at the site providing housing for students from 11 local colleges and universities. In 2007, a new main street dubbed America Boulevard opened, as did a 14-screen Regal movie theater complex, a variety of dining options, and two condominium buildings. Also located at University Town Center is a satellite campus of Prince George's Community College. A Safeway supermarket, with space for additional retail outlets, opened at University Town Center on April 6, 2016.

The development that restarted in the 2000s has been dubbed "the realization of a half-century old dream to counter the patterns of suburban sprawl."
