= Rock Creek Woods Historic District =

Historic district in Maryland, United States

- U.S. National Register of Historic Places
- U.S. Historic district
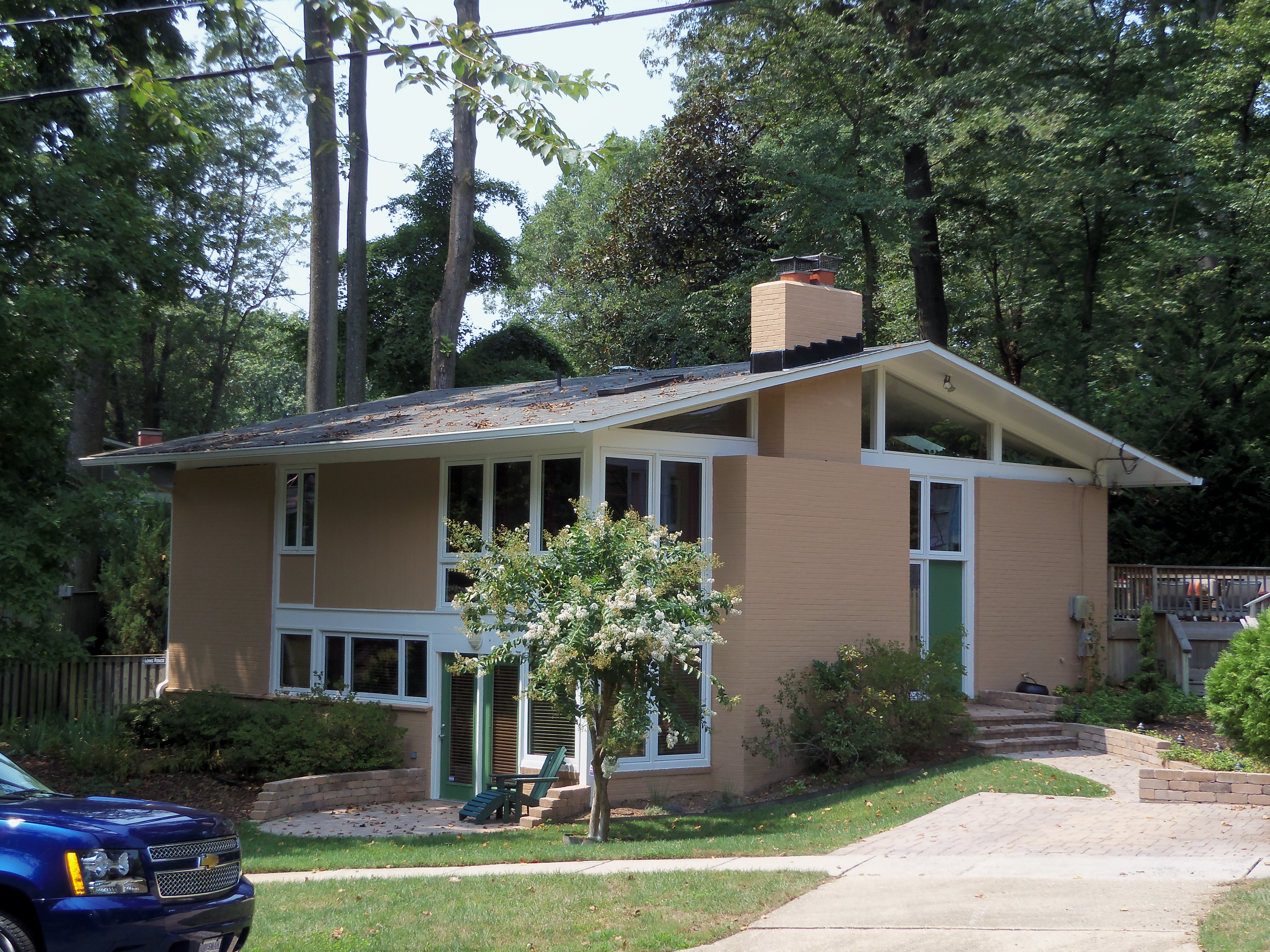

- Location within Maryland Location within the United States
- Location: 11504,11506 Connecticut Ave.,3600-3702 Spruell Dr.,3908-4020 Rickover Rd.,4004-4019 Ingersol Dr., Silver Spring, Maryland
- Coordinates: 39°2′45″N 77°4′43″W
- Area: 28 acres (11 ha)
- Built: 1958
- Built by: Bancroft Construction Co.
- Architect: Goodman, Charles M.
- Architectural style: Modern Movement, Contemporary
- NRHP reference No.: 04001354
- Added to NRHP: December 15, 2004

The Rock Creek Woods Historic District is a national historic district located north of Kensington, Montgomery County, Maryland (although the postal address is Silver Spring). This suburban development, consisting of 74 Contemporary houses, is nestled in a wooded valley between two creeks near Connecticut Avenue (MD 185). These houses were designed by Charles Goodman and built between 1958 and 1961 by Herschel and Marvin Blumberg, developers of New Town Center in nearby Hyattsville, Maryland. The original layout, including roads, lot configurations, and sidewalks, remains unaltered. During the 1960s, the neighborhood was home to a significant Jewish population and many people in the neighborhood were active in liberal causes, particularly the peace movement.

It was listed on the National Register of Historic Places in 2004.
