= Hammond Wood Historic District =

Historic district in Maryland, United States

- U.S. National Register of Historic Places
- U.S. Historic district
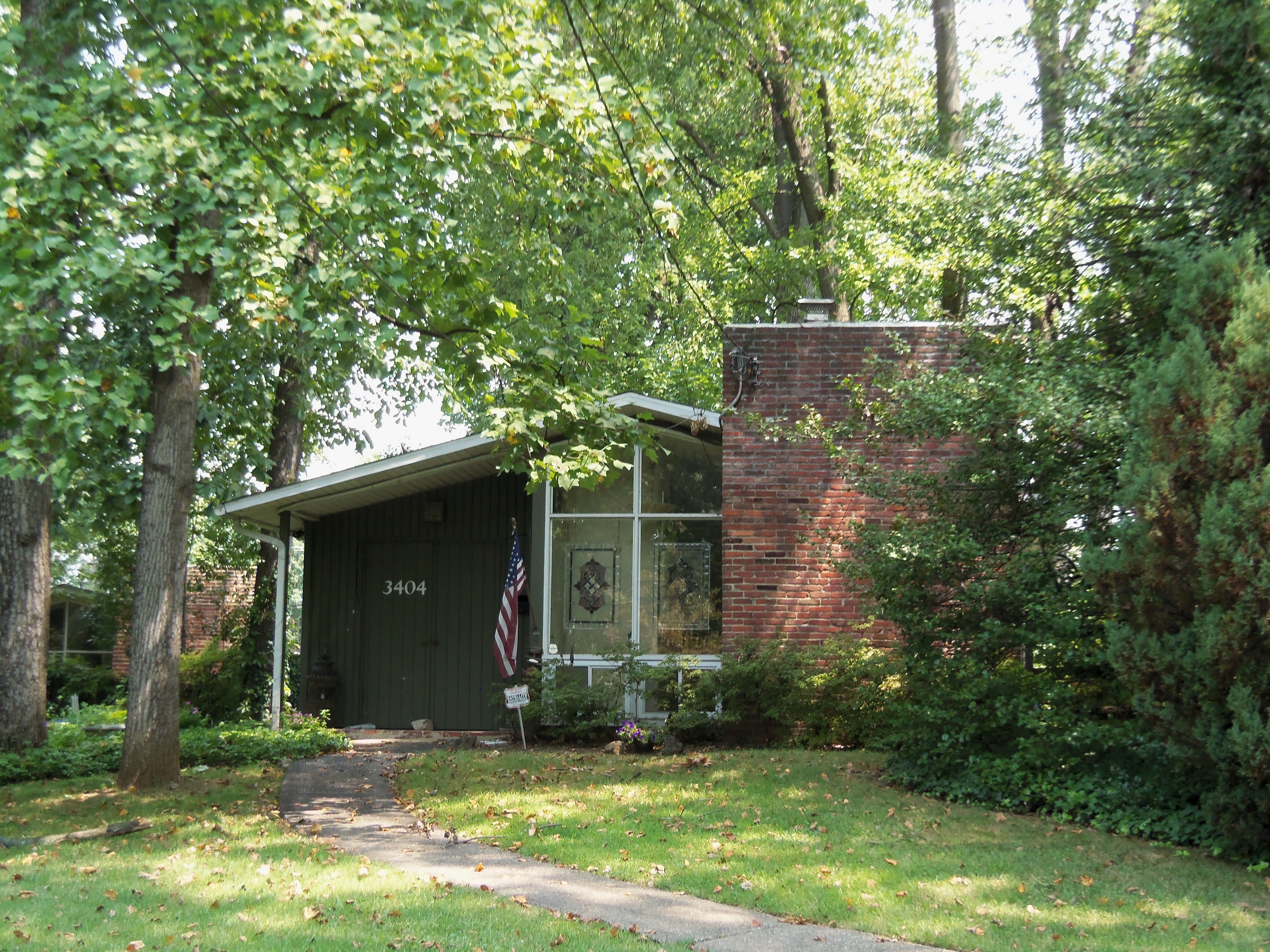

- Location within Maryland Location within the United States
- Location: Veirs Mill Rd., Highview Ave., Pendleton Dr., College View Dr., Woodridge Ave., Silver Spring, Maryland
- Coordinates: 39°2′51″N 77°4′8″W
- Area: 15 acres (6.1 ha)
- Built: 1949
- Architect: Goodman, Charles M.; Hammond, Paul & Burman, Paul I.
- Architectural style: Modern Movement, Contemporary
- MPS: Subdivisions and Architecture Planned and Designed by Charles M. Goodman Associates in Montgomery County, MD MPS
- NRHP reference No.: 04001355
- Added to NRHP: December 15, 2004

The Hammond Wood Historic District is a national historic district located at Silver Spring, Montgomery County, Maryland. It consists of 58 Contemporary single-family houses, built between 1949 and 1951, nestled in a tract of heavily wooded, rolling land. It is an intact, architecturally cohesive example of Charles Goodman's merchant builder subdivisions in Montgomery County.

It was listed on the National Register of Historic Places in 2004.
