= Unitarian Universalist Church of Arlington =

Historic church in Virginia, United States

- U.S. National Register of Historic Places
- Virginia Landmarks Register
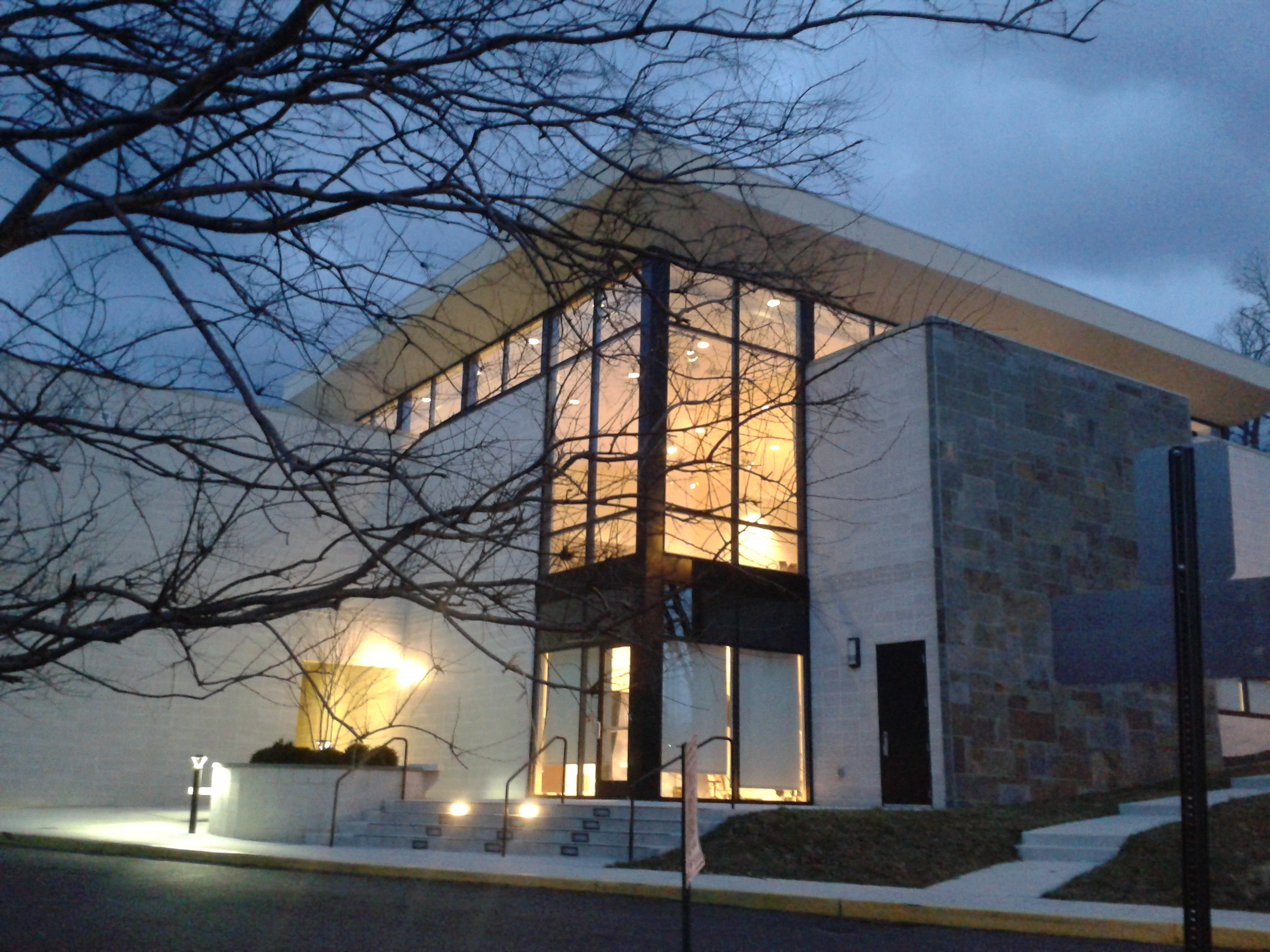
- Front of the church at dusk, March 2015

- Location within Virginia
- Location: 4444 Arlington Boulevard Arlington County, Virginia
- Coordinates: 38°52′6.07″N 77°6′26.95″W
- Built: 1964
- Architect: Charles M. Goodman
- Architectural style: Brutalist
- NRHP reference No.: 14000943
- VLR No.: 000-3424

Significant dates
- Added to NRHP: November 19, 2014
- Designated VLR: September 2014

Unitarian Universalist Church of Arlington (UUCA), historically known as the Unitarian Church of Arlington, is a Unitarian Universalist church located at 4444 Arlington Boulevard (U.S. 50) in Arlington County, Virginia. Founded in 1948, UUCA was the first Unitarian church in Washington, D.C.'s suburbs. Throughout its history, UUCA has taken part in progressive causes from the Civil Rights Movement to the legalization of same-sex marriage in Virginia. During the Civil Rights Movement, UUCA was the only Virginia church to speak out in favor of racial integration. UUCA's sanctuary building, designed by local architect Charles M. Goodman in 1964, is a concrete Brutalist structure that was listed on the National Register of Historic Places and Virginia Landmarks Register in 2014. It is one of only three church buildings designed by Goodman and the only one in Virginia.

== History ==
In the early 1940s, leaders from All Souls Church, established in 1821 as the first Unitarian church in Washington, D.C., encouraged its suburban members to start new Unitarian communities in their respective areas. The first one established in the suburbs was the Unitarian Church of Arlington with support and funds from the "mother church," All Souls. The first meeting was held in George A. Collier's home, located at 832 South Courthouse Road, on September 16, 1943. The following services were held in various spaces on Sunday afternoons so members could still attend the morning services at All Souls. Meeting spaces included the Buckingham Community Room, Ashton Heights Women's Club, and Kate Waller Barrett School. Gilbert A. Phillips, an associate pastor at All Souls, became the Arlington church's minister in 1946. Membership of the Arlington congregation reached 117 by 1948 while the church school had an enrollment of 103. That same year members voted to establish their own independent church. Their approved resolution stated: "Be it therefore resolved that the Board of Trustees be petitioned to terminate the Fellowship as an instrumentality of All Souls Church as of March 31, 1948, and be it further resolved that this Fellowship then be organized as a Unitarian Church affiliated with the American Unitarian Association."

As membership continued to grow, the congregation needed to find a permanent meeting place. The church purchased a 1.07 acre (0.43 ha) lot at the intersection of present-day Arlington Boulevard and South George Mason Drive. In November 1948, ground was broken on the church's first building, located at 4451 1st Place South, with assistance from the American Unitarian Association which gave the congregation a $15,000 loan. The original building was designed by architect and church member Earl B. Bailey. It was a brick Colonial Revival building containing an auditorium, a kitchen, an office for the minister, and a few meeting rooms. The first service in the new building was held in June 1949 and it was dedicated on October 2. By 1950, church membership had reached almost 250. The success of the Arlington church convinced All Souls minister Arthur Powell Davies to establish the Greater Washington Association for Unitarian Advance (later renamed the Greater Washington Association for Unitarian Universalist Churches) in 1950. The organization was founded to assist with establishing additional Unitarian congregations in the Washington, D.C., metropolitan area, and All Souls and the Arlington church were its first members.

UUCA's original building in 1957.

In 1953 a religious education wing, also designed by Bailey, was added to the church building, increasing the size of the auditorium and adding classrooms and offices. By the following year the church building had already reached its capacity and the congregation began holding two services on Sundays. The church school, with an enrollment of over 500, also began holding two services on Sundays. The church purchased adjoining property and in 1958 constructed the parsonage, a 1 1/2-story brick Colonial Revival building. By 1959, there were eight Unitarian congregations in Washington, D.C.'s suburbs, with the Arlington church being the largest. The congregation began planning for a new facility and chose Charles M. Goodman, a prominent local architect known for his modernist work, to design the church building. A church committee wrote that it was "confident that Mr. Goodman’s concept of design, his wide experience, and his original and creative genius promise for us a distinctive building which will portray in structural form the spirit and aspiration of this congregation." Church leaders invited the congregation to give suggestions for Goodman's design which included "an architectural style which would express the inspiring tradition of Unitarianism in Virginia" and a "free form and no stained glass, [resulting in] a building to represent our cleavage with the past." The congregation wanted the building to "reflect their liberal, progressive beliefs and that would signify the UUCA's leadership position within the denomination." According to one UUCA minister, "Charles Goodman spent a lot of time with the congregation and incorporating the values and theology of the congregation into the design of the building." Goodman finished his design in late 1961 and the church began seeking financing shortly thereafter. His design included plans for a main sanctuary and adjoining wing, the latter which was not built at the time due to budget concerns. Construction of the sanctuary was carried out by the Martin Brothers contracting firm. The total cost was approximately $300,000, and the dedication was held on March 22, 1964, with a sermon by Dana McLean Greeley entitled "Building a Faith for the Future." UUCA's sanctuary is one of only three churches designed by Goodman and his only church building in Virginia. His other two church designs are Bethesda United Church of Christ in Bethesda, Maryland, and Christ Church of Washington (now called Embassy Church) in Washington, D.C.

In the mid-to-late 1960s, attendance at church services and enrollment at the church school experienced dramatic decreases. The congregation replaced their minister and began a campaign to attract new members. Attendance gradually increased over the next several years and by 1974, membership had reached 724. The church continued to thrive throughout the next decade and by the late 1980s, church members decided more space was needed. The congregation held meetings regarding the church expansion throughout the next several years. Finally, in 1993, members approved the construction of an addition to the sanctuary. The new wing, designed by Kerns Group Architects of Washington, D.C., and built by Dustin Construction, Inc. of Gaithersburg, Maryland, was dedicated on October 2, 1994. The addition included classrooms and office space, a chapel, and meetings rooms. The design of the new wing was praised by architectural critics and Kerns Group Architects received an Excellence in Architecture award from the American Institute of Architects's Virginia chapter. An additional expansion, designed by Intec Group of Fairfax, Virginia, and built by Sully Construction of Sterling, Virginia, was added in 2013 and includes a hall space and multipurpose activity room. UUCA's 1964 sanctuary was listed on the Virginia Landmarks Register in September 2014 and the National Register of Historic Places on November 19, 2014, following a two-year effort for the building to be named a historic landmark. One of the church's leaders said "We're hoping by it being put on the national registry, people will realize that the physical presence of a group in a community matters. It says something to the world." The 900-member congregation is currently led by Senior Minister Rev. Amanda Poppei and Rev. Carol Thomas Cissel, Minister of Social Justice and Community Development. Prominent members, past and present, at UUCA include Representative William R. Ratchford of Connecticut and Arlington County Board Member Jay Fisette, Virginia's first openly gay elected official.

=== Activism ===
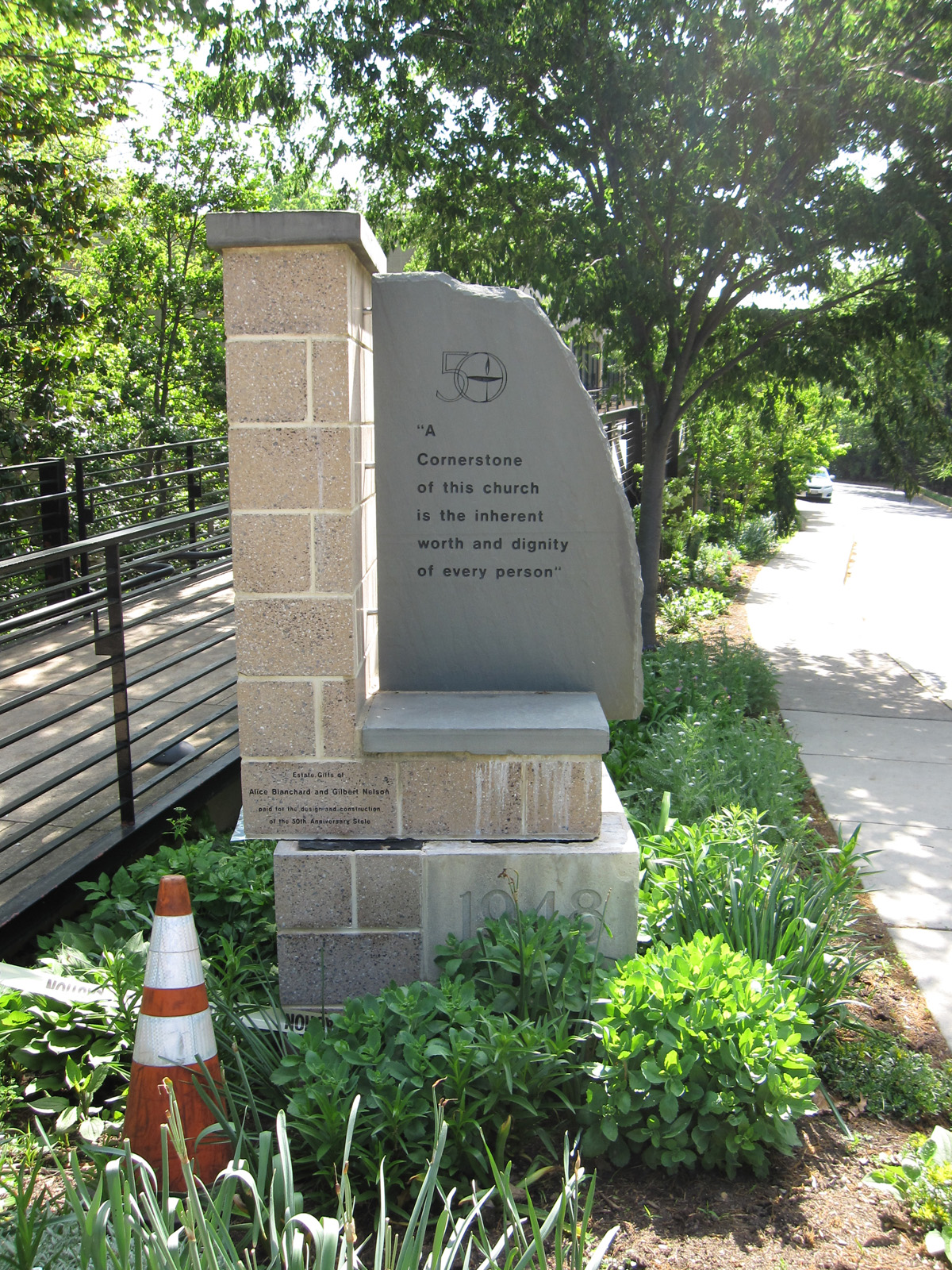
Cornerstone of the church

Like other Unitarian congregations, UUCA is a liberal church that has been active in social justice causes and interfaith dialogue throughout its history. When UUCA was founded, church leaders wrote "Our Church like all Unitarian Churches, is dedicated to the progressive transformation and ennoblement of individual and social life through religion, in accordance with the advancing knowledge and the growing vision of mankind." In 1949, a time when most local organizations were segregated, the church operated a children's summer camp open to all races. During the 1950s, the church was one of the few places in Northern Virginia where black and white individuals met to discuss race relations and ways to improve society. In 1951, UUCA minister Ross Allen Weston founded the Community Council for Social Progress, an interracial, interfaith group that promoted "full development of democratic principles in human relationship". UUCA's members were active during the Civil Rights Movement of the 1950s and 1960s, protesting against segregation and other unfair treatments of minorities. In June 1956, UUCA minister Weston, who was also president of the Unitarian Fellowship for Social Justice, received a letter of gratitude from Martin Luther King Jr. Following the landmark 1954 Supreme Court decision, Bolling v. Sharpe, which made segregation in Washington, D.C.'s public schools illegal, Virginia Governor Thomas B. Stanley sought input from the state's citizens. UUCA was the only Virginia church that spoke out in favor of integration.

In October 1958, the church received a bomb threat the morning of a sermon by Rabbi Emmet A. Frank of Temple Beth-El. This was part of a larger effort by the American Nazi Party, headquartered in Arlington, to intimidate synagogues and other institutions affiliated with or friendly towards Judaism. The bomb threat was widely condemned by area churches and the Arlington congregation released a statement saying it would not be intimidated, harassed, or coerced to change the way it practiced religion. The church continued to support civil rights causes in the 1960s, registering black voters from Arlington County, and renaming its 1949 building (now demolished) Reeb Hall in honor of James Reeb, an All Souls minister who was killed by segregationists while protesting in Selma, Alabama. Since the 1970s, church members have continued to advocate social justice causes including, but not limited to, environmentalism, women's rights, LGBT rights, and affordable housing. One of UUCA's most prominent projects was the Culpepper Garden Senior Center, a nonprofit retirement housing community for low-income senior citizens, which opened in 1975 and has expanded since then. From the 1990s until it was demolished in 2011, Reeb Hall was rented out to nonprofit groups including the Northern Virginia chapter of Habitat for Humanity and Arlington Street People's Assistance Network. Since the 1990s, Kol Ami, a Reconstructionist Jewish community, has met at UUCA in the library and fellowship rooms.

== Design and location ==
The church is located on a 3.97 acre (1.61 ha) lot on the southwest corner of Arlington Boulevard (U.S. 50) and South George Mason Drive near the Arlington Forest neighborhood. The property extends south to First Place South, a residential street where the church parsonage is located. A large parking lot, where Reeb Hall once stood, is on the south and west sides of the property. Church attendees access the building's 1994 wing from the parking lot via concrete walkways and a concrete pedestrian bridge beneath a steel canopy. South of the church is the Memorial Wall and Garden, dedicated in 1996. The landscaped garden includes concrete walls, paths, and benches. Concrete blocks inscribed with the names of church members are also found throughout the garden. South of the garden is a playground, built in 2007, that is enclosed by a wooden fence. The 1964 sanctuary, which faces the road intersection, is on the northeast corner of the property on a wooded knoll.

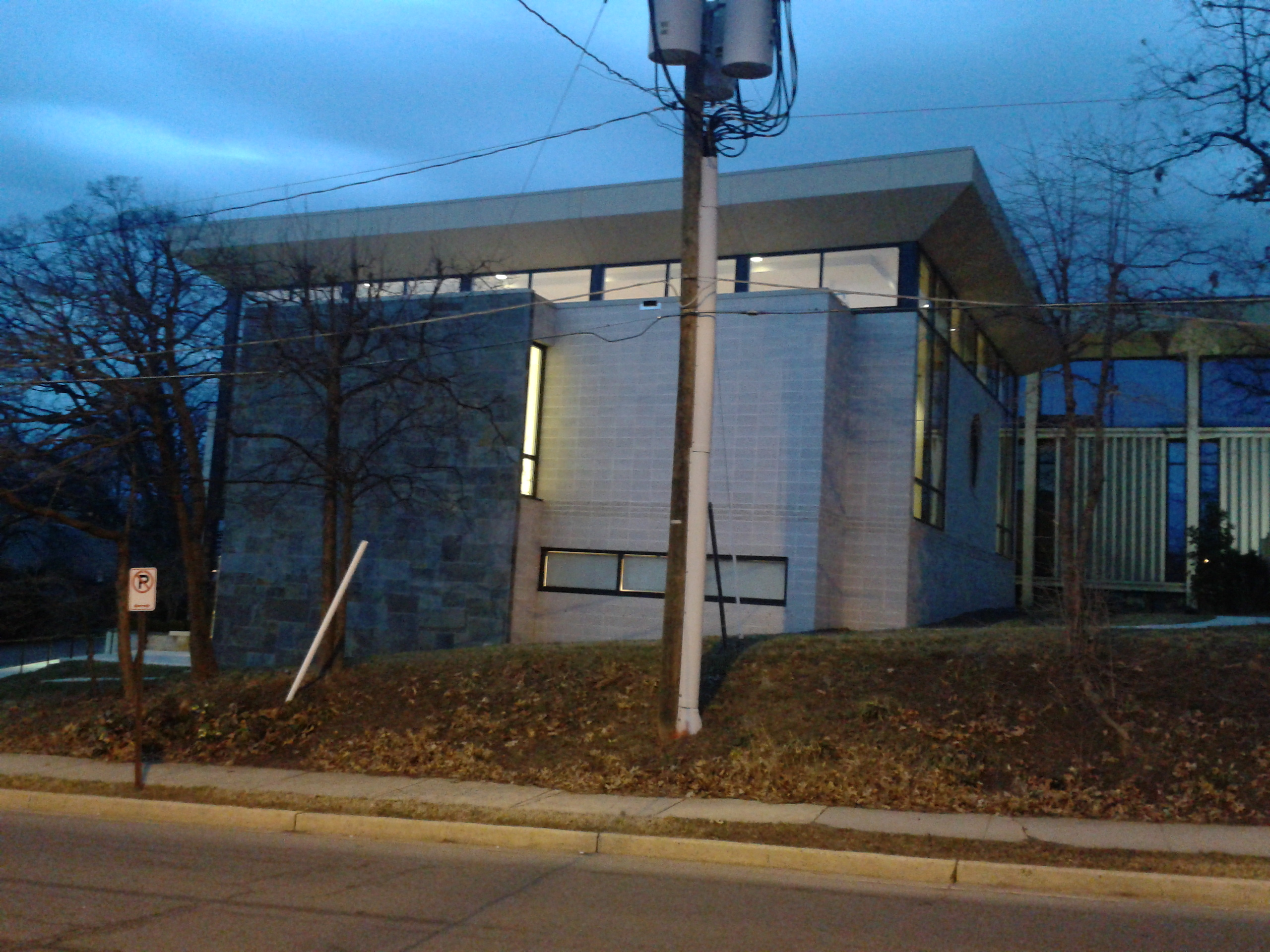
Facade of the church, seen from Arlington Boulevard

UUCA is composed of three sections: the 1964 sanctuary is a rectangular-shaped, two-story reinforced concrete building; the 1994 addition is a two-story rectangular-shaped concrete structure on the south side of the sanctuary; the 2013 addition is a two-story square-shaped concrete structure on the east side of the 1994 addition and southeast corner of the sanctuary. The two additions "complement the original building in their scale, style, material, and fenestration pattern, and fulfill Goodman’s original plans to expand the church with additional space for educational, administrative, and social functions." They are set back and at a lower height in deference to the sanctuary.

The sanctuary is a precast concrete building designed in the brutalist style. It features an overhanging concrete flat roof, concrete block foundation, and corrugated concrete wall panels. Square clerestory windows are on the north, east, and west sides of the building's top level and narrow fixed-light windows are on the first floor. The east and west sides of the sanctuary are five bays wide while the north and south sides feature three bays, a large central bay with a smaller bay on each side. The bays are defined by tall concrete columns, spaced 16 feet (4.9 m) apart, that stand from the ground to the underside of the roof. Pale blue wooden doors flanked by black wooden frames provide access to the sanctuary while there are two narrow doors on the north side. The main entrance to the sanctuary is on the south side where the 1994 addition is sited. The 1994 addition runs along the entire south side of the sanctuary and extends west past the building. It is a 26,000 sq ft (2,400 m^{2}) building that includes a social hall, classrooms, and office space. Like the sanctuary, the 1994 addition features a flat roof and concrete foundation. The concrete walls are a lighter color than the sanctuary and are also smoother. A one-story terrace was originally on the southeast corner of the 1994 addition, but this was replaced by the 2013 addition, named the Celebration Center. The Celebration Center is also faced with light-colored concrete and has a random-coursed stone facing on its east side. Similar to the sanctuary, it features an overhanging roof and wrapping clerestory windows.

The sanctuary's meeting space measures 62 feet (19 m) by 62 feet and features a polished reinforced concrete floor set in a large grid pattern. The north, east, and west walls are faced with beige brick while the ceiling is exposed concrete. The sanctuary's design allows for the meeting space to have natural lighting which is complemented by patterned rows of light fixtures along the ceiling. The fixtures are the original black-painted, metal cylinders designed by Goodman. A 2.5 foot (0.76 m) high concrete platform stage, now covered with wood, is on the north wall. It features a wheelchair ramp obscured by a decorative wood screen. Seating in the meeting space is composed of padded, moveable pews and chairs. There are two staircase lobbies on the south side of the meeting space that lead to the first floor. The east staircase provides access to the choir balcony via concrete dogleg stairs and an elevator installed in 1974. Goodman chose to place the choir on the south side of the space because he considered it "the most desirable location for a choir." The balcony features stepped stairs for choir members and a large pipe organ. The ground floor is a north-south corridor plan with an east-west corridor on the south side giving access to the staircases. The lower floor, which includes meeting and storage spaces, features concrete floors in most areas, concrete block dividing walls, and concrete ceilings.

== See also ==
- List of Unitarian, Universalist, and Unitarian Universalist churches
- National Register of Historic Places listings in Arlington County, Virginia
