= Houston House Apartments =

Coordinates: 29.7515°N 95.3677°W

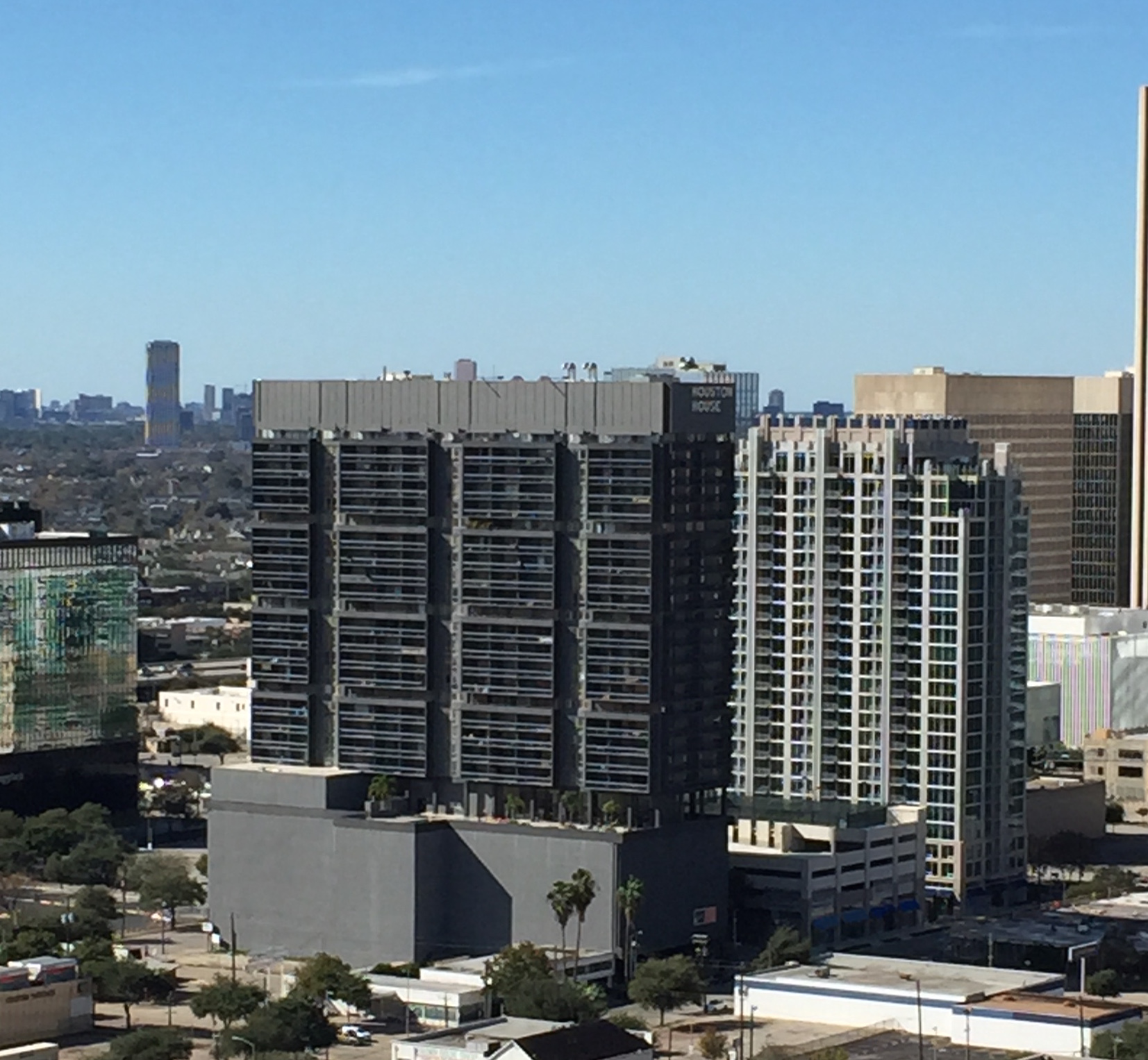
- Interactive map of the Houston House Apartments area

General information
- Type: High-rise, residential
- Architectural style: Modernist
- Location: 1617 Fannin Street; Houston, Texas, USA 77002
- Opened: 1966
- Renovated: 2010–2012
- Renovation cost: $10 million
- Owner: Sumar Realty

Height
- Height: 293 ft (89 m)

Technical details
- Floor count: 31

Design and construction
- Architect: Charles M. Goodman

Renovating team
- Renovating firm: Kirksey

Website
- houstonhouseapts.com

Houston House Apartments is a 31-story apartment complex in the Skyline District of Downtown Houston, Texas, United States.

The building, located in the southern portion of Downtown, has 396 apartments. Charles M. Goodman designed the building, which opened in 1966. Since 1983 Larry Hill of Sumar Realty Corp. and a group of investors have owned the building as part of a partnership. As of 2007 the building had a 90% occupancy rate, and it was one of the few residential buildings in Downtown Houston that had been in operation for around 40 years.

Several years prior to 2010, the owners tried to sell the building to a Chicago company, NVG Residential. NVG planned to close on the property in January 2008. After the planned acquisition NVG planned to install new windows, re-paint the exterior, improve the lobby and the 9th and 10th floor amenity areas. In the amenity areas the company planned to install a business and fitness center, and updated club house, a basketball court, a pool, and an outdoor dining area. The deal with the Chicago firm failed. By 2010 Hill and his business partners began a planned over $10 million renovation of the building.

In 2007 a vehicle driving in the apartment complex's garage punched through the wall of the garage and landed wheels up on another downtown building. The driver died in the crash.

== Composition ==
The average size of the units is 650 square feet (60 m^{2}). Most units range in size from 500 square feet (46 m^{2}) to 840 square feet (78 m^{2}). In 2007 the per-period rent was between $800 and $1,300.

== Education ==
Houston House is within the Houston Independent School District. It is zoned to Gregory Lincoln Education Center for elementary school (K-5) and middle school (6-8), and Northside High School (formerly Davis High).

By Spring 2011 Atherton Elementary School and E.O. Smith Education Center were consolidated with a new K-5 campus in the Atherton site. As a result for grades 6-8 the building was rezoned from Smith to Gregory Lincoln.
