= Tauxemont Historic District =

Historic district in Virginia, United States

- U.S. National Register of Historic Places
- U.S. Historic district
- Virginia Landmarks Register
- Fairfax County Inventory of Historic Sites
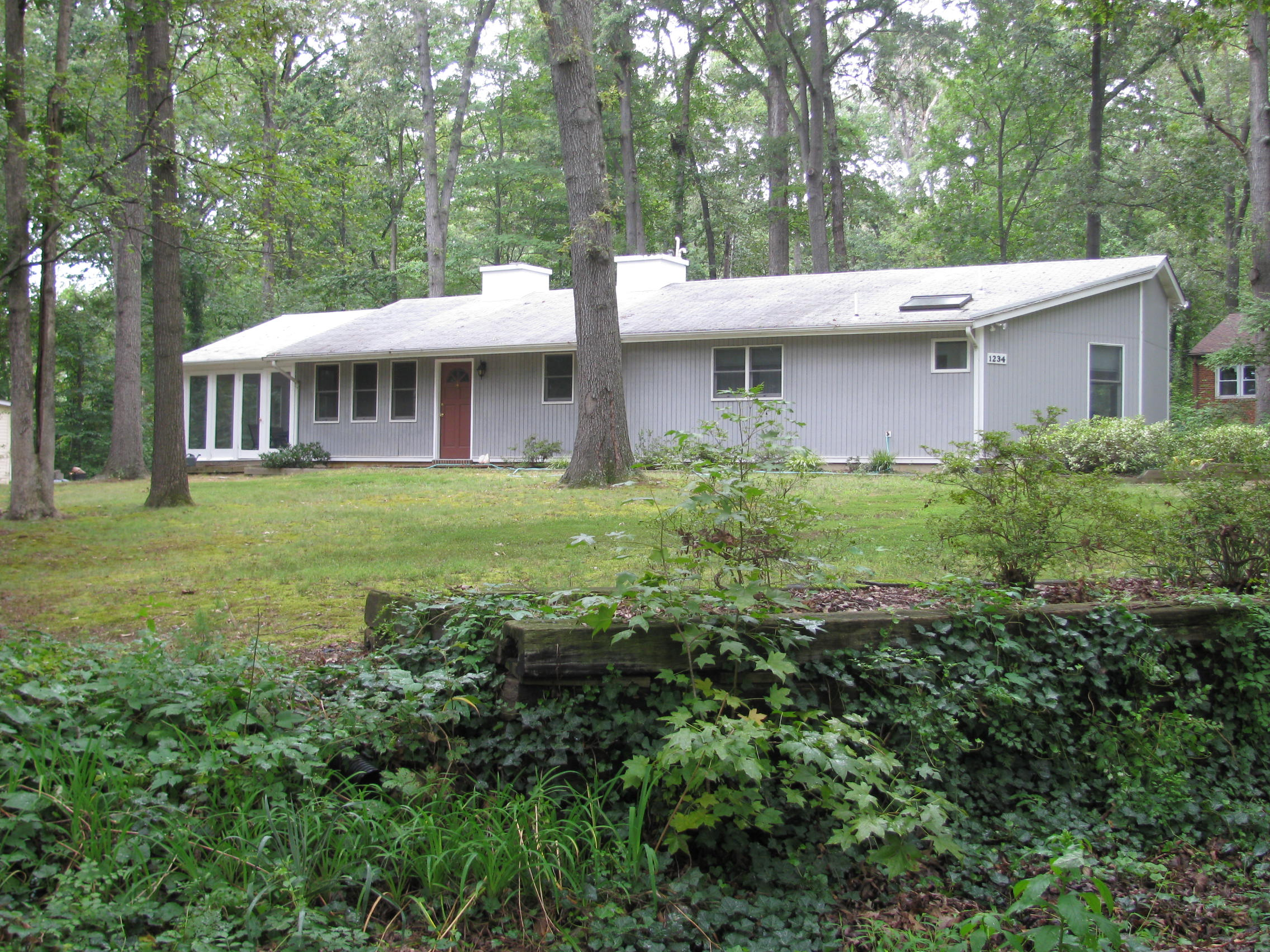
- Home in the Tauxemont Historic District, September 2012

- Location within Northern Virginia Location within Virginia Location within the United States
- Location: Between Fort Hunt Rd. and Accotink Place, inc. Shenandoah, Tauxemont, Namassin, Westmoreland and Gahant Rds. and Bolling, near Alexandria, Virginia
- Coordinates: 38°44′37″N 77°03′14″W
- Area: 50 acres (20 ha)
- Built: 1941-1955
- Architect: Davenport, Robert; et al.
- Architectural style: Modern Movement
- NRHP reference No.: 06000033
- VLR No.: 029-5199

Significant dates
- Added to NRHP: February 9, 2006
- Designated VLR: December 7, 2005
- Designated FCIHS: September 12, 1972

Tauxemont Historic District is a national historic district located near Alexandria, Fairfax County, Virginia. It encompasses 71 contributing buildings, 1 contributing site, and 1 contributing structure in a World War II-era subdivision near Alexandria.

In 1941, developer Robert Davenport and architect Alexander Knowlton as part of 20 original families created a cooperative and purchased the land for housing development. It was developed in three sections between 1941 and 1955. The basic Tauxemont house is a cinder block one-story, side-gable-roofed rectangular starter house. Included in the district are 10 Lustron houses, which in the Tauxemont District were constructed with post-World War II aluminum rather than the traditional steel. Some houses have additions designed by architect Charles M. Goodman, who Davenport had been working with on nearby Hollin Hills.

It was listed on the National Register of Historic Places as a historic district of state-level significance in 2006.

== Infrastructure ==
=== Transportation ===
Motor vehicles are the most common form of transportation to and from the community. County restrictions prohibit the parking of watercraft, motor homes, campers, trailers, and other large vehicles on public streets, as the community is within the Mount Vernon Community Parking District.

Virtually all public roads (interstate, primary and secondary) in Fairfax County are maintained by the Virginia Department of Transportation (VDOT). The county's public bus service, Fairfax Connector, has nearby connections via Route 101 (Fort Hunt–Mt. Vernon) and Route 152 (Groveton–Fort Hunt) routes, located near the intersection of Fort Hunt Rd and Gahant Rd, near the Hollin Halls shopping center. The Huntington station serves as the nearest rapid transit terminal of the Washington Metro (WMATA) system. Ronald Reagan Washington National Airport (DCA), located approximately 8 miles north, is the closest airport for residents.

=== Utilities ===
Trash and recycling collection throughout Fairfax County is performed either by the county or private collection company. The entirety of Tauxemont is located within the County Collection service area

Tauxemont's water is drawn from a large, eastern regional aquifer. The Tauxemont Community Association (TCA) operates three wells in the community. TCA owns and operates its water system under the jurisdiction of the Virginia Department of Environmental Quality (DEQ) and Virginia Department of Health (VDH), which implements standards in compliance with the U.S. Environmental Protection Agency’s drinking water standards. The DEQ permit for groundwater withdrawal is complemented by the public water supply permit (drinking water) from the VDH.

Dominion Energy is the primary supplier of electricity to area residents. Homes with natural gas are supplied Washington Gas.

Regulated wireline telephone service (aka, land line), digital/cable TV service, and residential Internet service is available with Comcast, Cox and Verizon.

== Government ==
For elections, the historic district is located within the Hollin Hall (606) voting precinct and the Hollin Hall Center is the polling place.

- In the U.S. House of Representatives, residents are represented by Virginia's 8th congressional district.
- For representation in the Virginia General Assembly, the community rests inside Virginia's 44th House of Delegates district and Virginia's 36th Senate district, for State Delegate and State Senator, respectively.
- At the local level, citizens are served by the Mount Vernon Magisterial District of Fairfax County for representation amongst the Fairfax County Board of Supervisors. The Tauxemont Community Association is a member association of the Mount Vernon Council of Citizens’ Associations, which was formed to represent and promote the interests of its member associations and to further the common good and general welfare of the residents of the Mount Vernon Magisterial District.

Mount Vernon Station No. 9, located in Sherwood Hall Lane, is the nearest response unit for emergency services from the Fairfax County Fire and Rescue Department (FCFRD).

Of the eight police stations of the Fairfax County Police Department (FCPD), Mount Vernon District Police Station is nearest the community.
