= Laurentien Hotel =

Former hotel building in Montreal, Canada

Hotel Laurentien
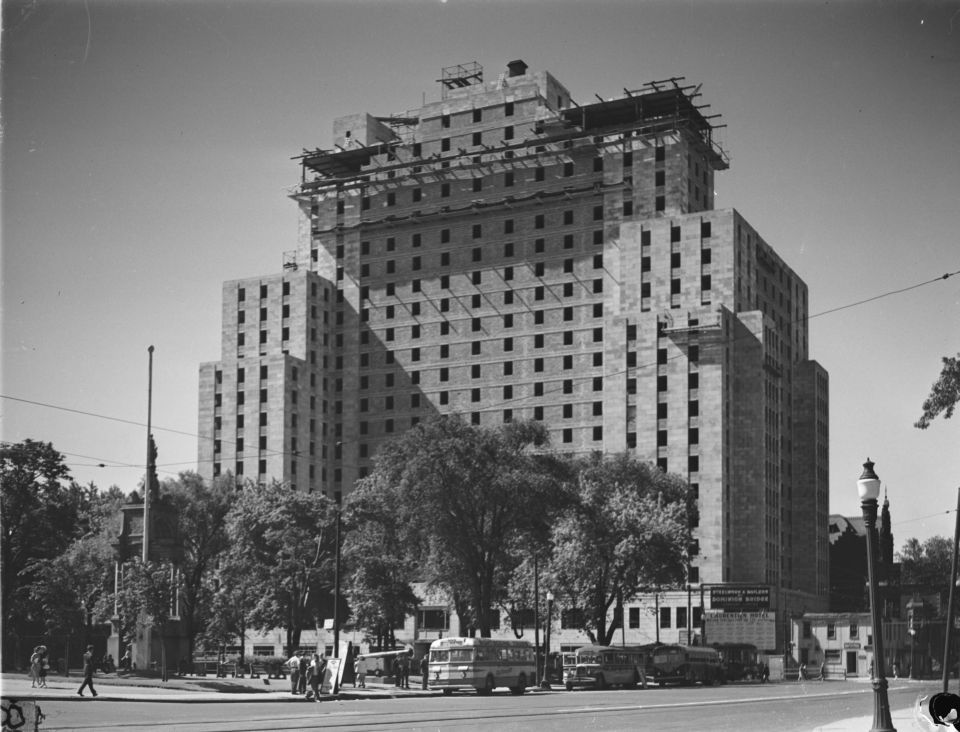
- Laurentien Hotel during its construction in 1947

General information
- Architectural style: Streamline Moderne
- Inaugurated: March 20, 1948
- Demolished: 1977

Technical details
- Floor count: 21

Design and construction
- Architect: Charles Davis Goodman

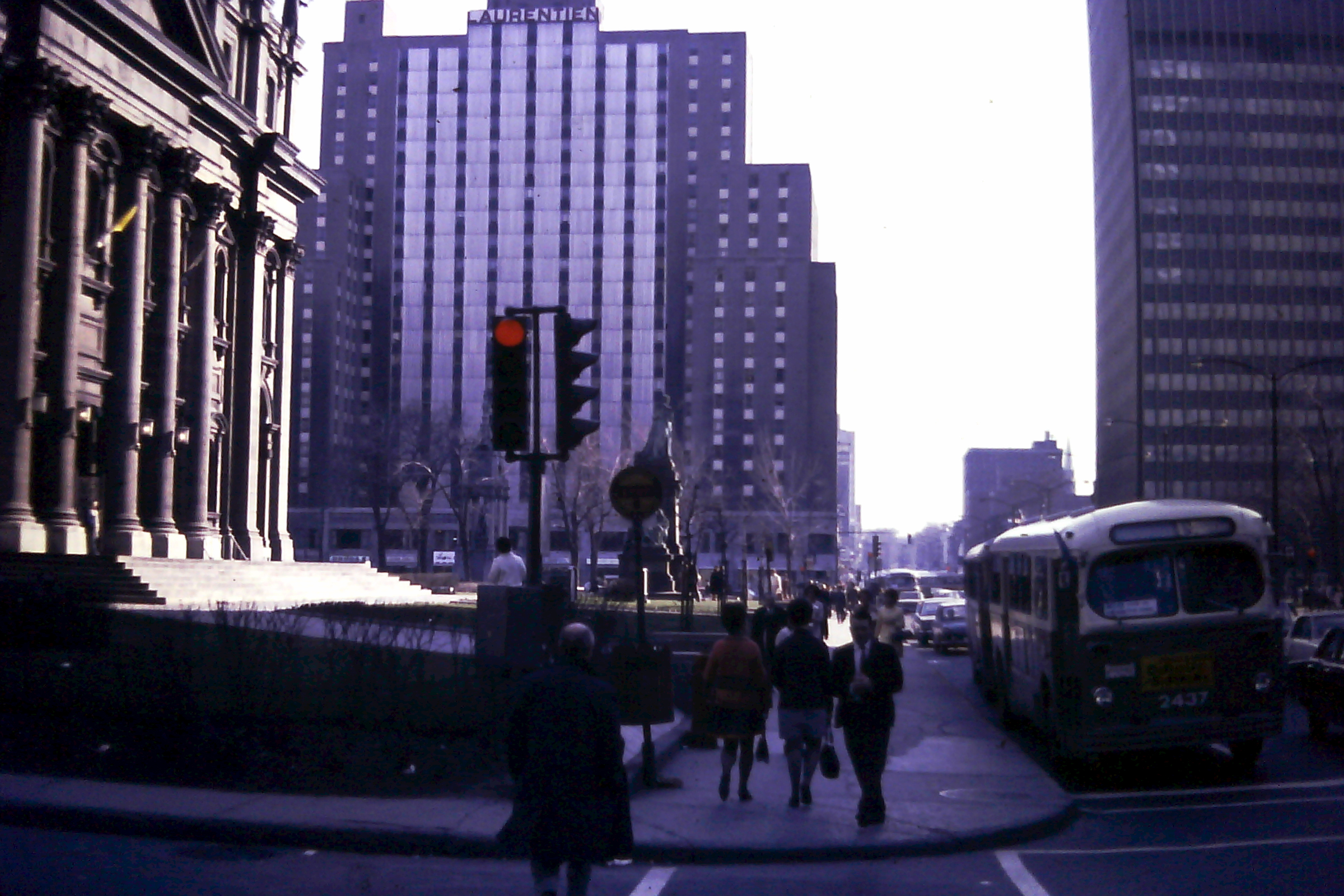
Laurentien Hotel, 1967

The Laurentien Hotel was an 1100-room hotel on Dorchester Street (now René Lévesque Boulevard) in Montreal, Quebec, Canada. The hotel was built in 1948 and demolished in 1977.

== History ==
The hotel's location was the site of the Dominion-Square Methodist Church from 1865 until 1912. The Laurentien Hotel was designed by Charles Davis Goodman, the architect of a number of prominent Streamline Moderne structures in the city, including the Bens De Luxe Delicatessen & Restaurant and the Jewish General Hospital. The building had 21 stories with 1,100 rooms.

The Hotel Laurentien opened on March 20, 1948. Approximately 400 guests attended the hotel's grand opening, including mayor Camillien Houde and Archbishop Joseph Charbonneau. Houde said in his opening speech that the use by the hotel's Anglophone builder of the French spelling of "Laurentien" symbolized good relations between the Francophone and Anglophone communities of Montreal. The Ford Hotels chain (including the Laurentien) was purchased by Sheraton in 1949 and the hotel was renamed The Laurentien - A Sheraton Hotel. Canadian Pacific purchased the hotel from Sheraton in 1969, with plans to redevelop the location with a headquarters office tower, but Sheraton continued to rent and operate the hotel, citing it as one of the "top five" moneymakers in their entire 350-property chain.

In 1975, the hotel suffered a fire in its dining room, which forced its evacuation and brief closure. The hotel was granted a reprieve from demolition when the Bank of Montreal dropped out of the Canadian Pacific redevelopment plans, and it remained open to house crowds visiting Montreal for the 1976 Summer Olympics. After the Olympics, the preservation group Save Montreal attempted to convince Canadian Pacific to retain the structure. Members of the group bought shares in Canadian Pacific and filed suit in the Superior Court of Quebec to enjoin Canadian Pacific and its subsidiary Marathon Realties from demolishing the building, but by the time the brief was filed, in February 1977, Canadian Pacific had already begun demolition, and the judge denied the brief, saying the building was already effectively destroyed. At the time, it was the largest hotel ever demolished in Canada.

Canadian Pacific's plans for redevelopment fell through, and the site remained vacant until the La Laurentienne Building was built in 1986.

== Elevator ==
Turnbull Elevator Company Limited
