= Virginia Heights Historic District =

Historic district in Virginia, United States

- U.S. National Register of Historic Places
- U.S. Historic district
- Virginia Landmarks Register
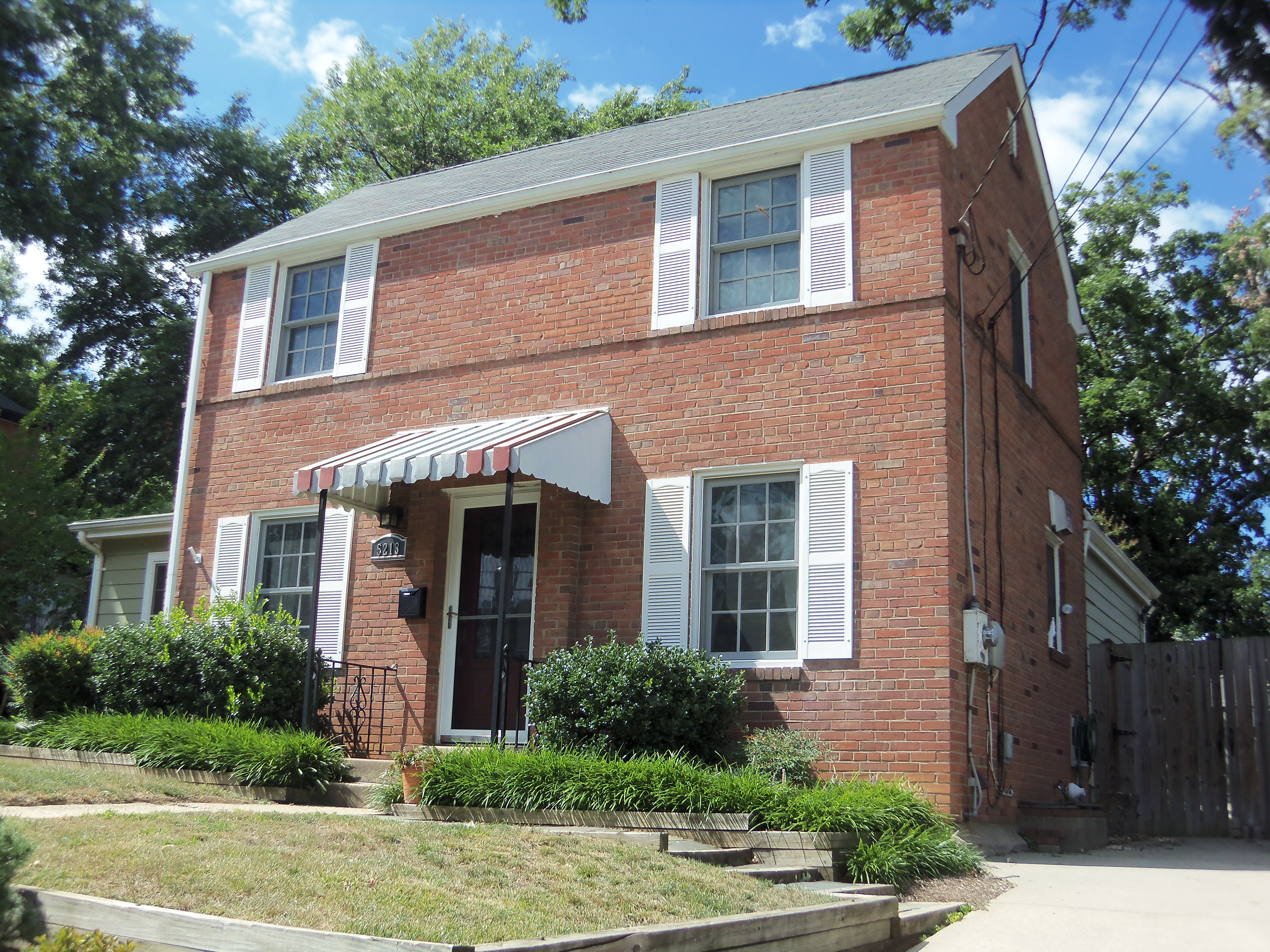

- Location within District of Columbia Location within Virginia Location within the United States
- Location: Bounded by 10th Pl. S., S. Frederick St. & S. George Mason Dr., Arlington, Virginia
- Coordinates: 38°51′02″N 77°6′52″W
- Area: 29.6 acres (12.0 ha)
- Built: 1946
- Built by: Lindsey Construction Co., et al.
- Architect: Goodman, Charles M.
- Architectural style: Colonial Revival, Modern Movement
- MPS: Historic Residential Suburbs in the United States, 1830-1960 MPS
- NRHP reference No.: 08000065
- VLR No.: 000-9701

Significant dates
- Added to NRHP: February 21, 2008
- Designated VLR: December 5, 2007

The Virginia Heights Historic District is a national historic district located at Arlington County, Virginia. It is directly west of the Columbia Forest Historic District. It contains 117 contributing buildings in a residential neighborhood in southwestern Arlington. The area was developed between 1946 and 1952, and consists of four small subdivisions of Section Four of Columbia Forest, High Point, Virginia Heights, and Frederick Hill. The dwelling styles include Colonial Revival style houses and Modernist twin dwellings designed by noted local architect Charles M. Goodman. In addition, five single dwellings in Virginia Heights are known to be prefabricated houses, three of which are Lustron houses.

It was listed on the National Register of Historic Places in 2008.
