= Alcoa Care-free Home =

Historic house in New York, United States

- U.S. National Register of Historic Places
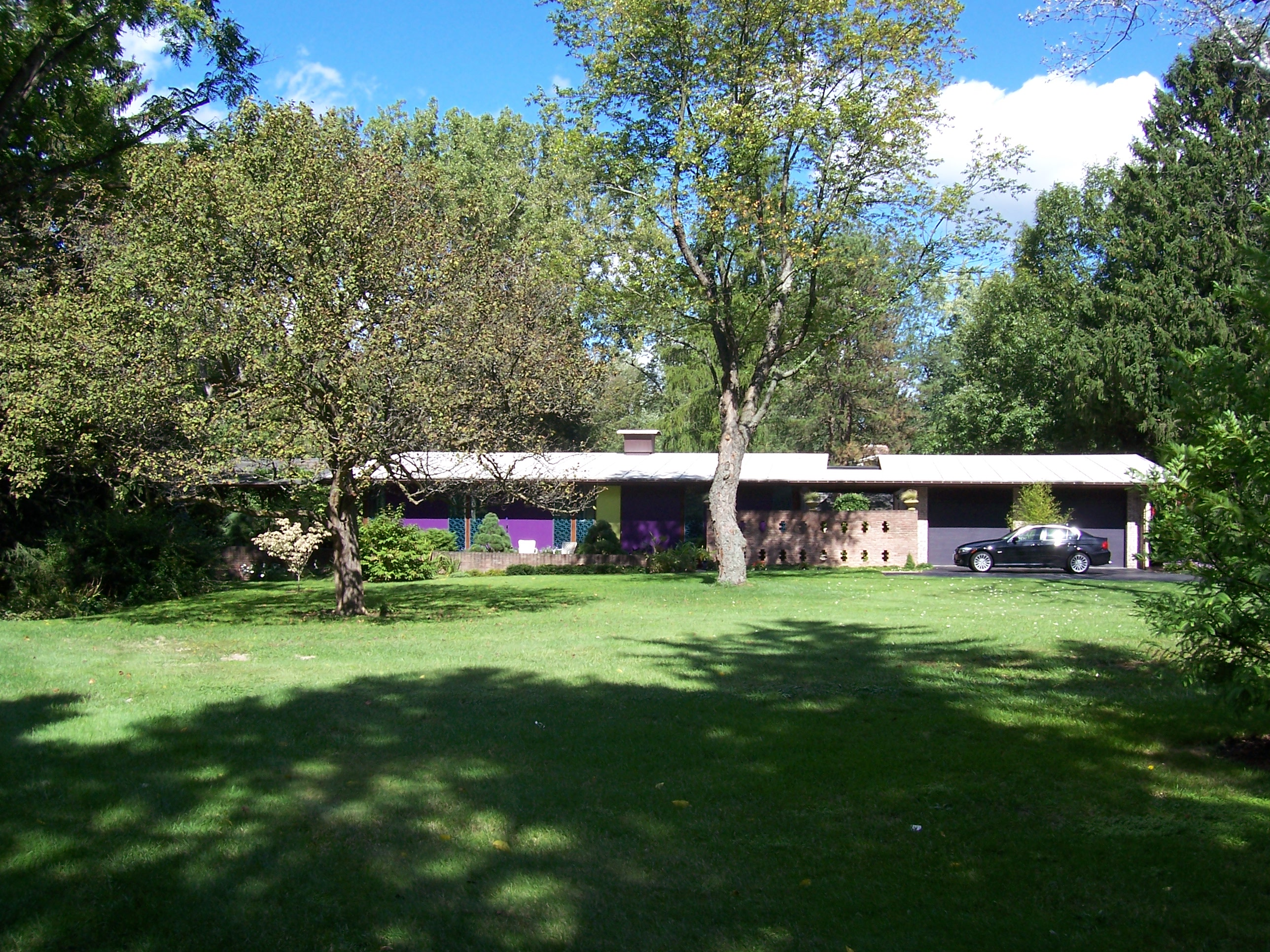
- Alcoa Care-free Home, September 2012

- Location within New York Location within the United States
- Location: 1589 Clover St., Brighton, New York
- Coordinates: 43°7′38.64″N 77°32′49.27″W
- Area: .9 acres (0.36 ha)
- Built: 1957; 69 years ago
- Architect: Goodman, Charles M.
- Architectural style: Modern
- NRHP reference No.: 10000358
- Added to NRHP: June 18, 2010

Alcoa Care-free Home is a historic home located at Brighton in Monroe County, New York. It was designed by Charles M. Goodman (1906–1992) and is one of 24 Alcoa Care-free Homes listed in their sales brochure of 1957 that were built for a demonstration project and the only one located New York State. It is a one-story, Ranch-style house with 1,900 square feet (180 m^{2}) of living space, a carport, and a full basement. It is 91 feet (28 m) long and 36 feet (11 m) wide. It is of post and beam construction with a shallow pitched, side gabled roof. It features end walls constructed completely of plate glass framed by aluminum and supported by wood columns that are clad in aluminum.

It was listed on the National Register of Historic Places in 2010.

== See also ==
- Alcoa Care-free Homes
- Hollin Hills Historic District
- Green Machine / Blue Space, another experimental home in New York
