= Takoma Avenue Historic District =

Historic house in Maryland, United States

- U.S. National Register of Historic Places
- U.S. Historic district
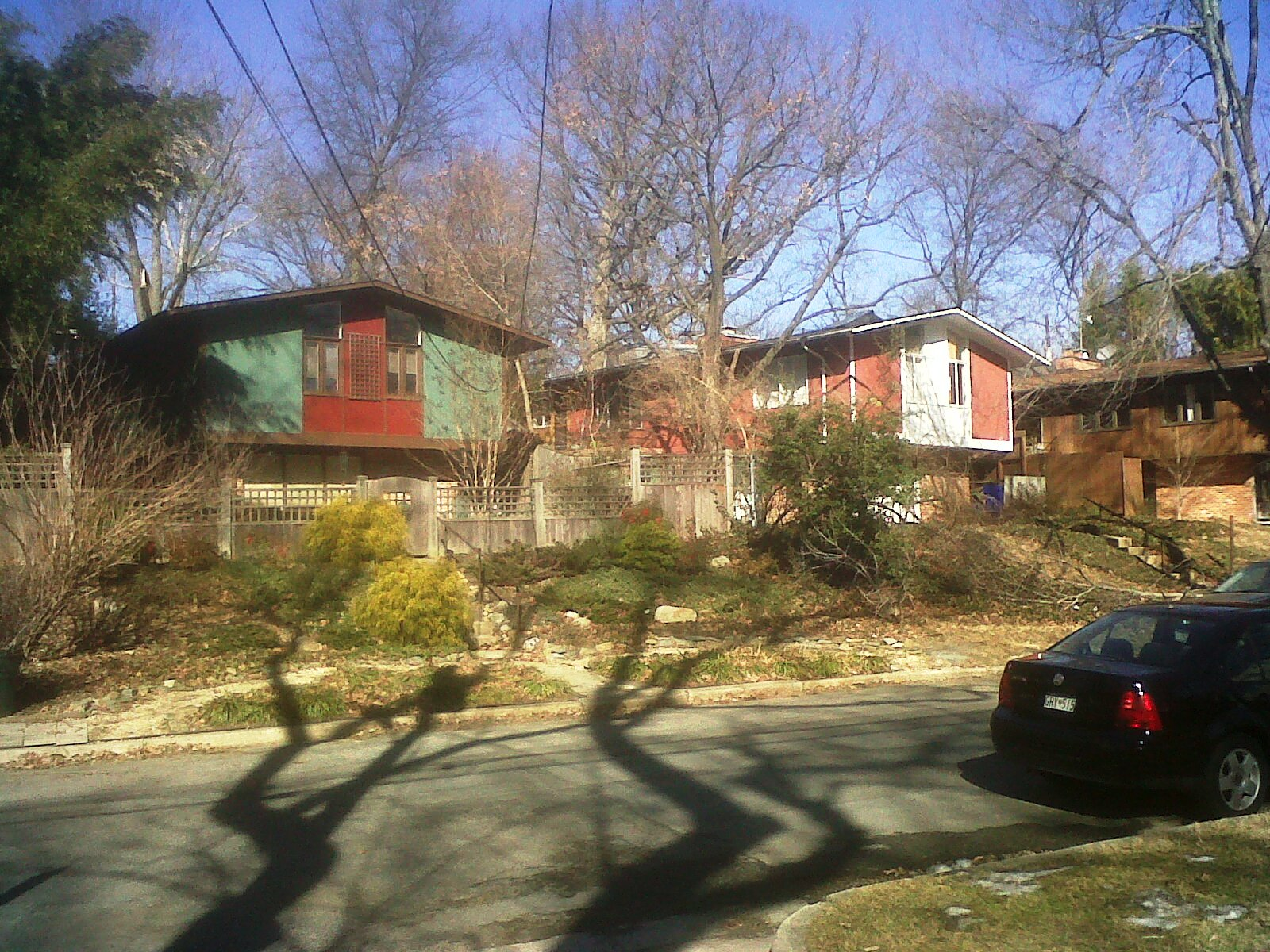

- Location within Maryland Location within the United States
- Location: 7906,7908,7910,7912,7914 Takoma Ave., Takoma Park, Maryland
- Coordinates: 38°59′18″N 77°1′5″W
- Area: less than one acre
- Built: 1951
- Architect: Goodman, Charles M.; et.al.
- Architectural style: Modern Movement, Contemporary
- MPS: Subdivisions and Architecture Planned and Designed by Charles M. Goodman Associates in Montgomery County, MD MPS
- NRHP reference No.: 04001353
- Added to NRHP: December 15, 2004

The Takoma Avenue Historic District is a national historic district located at Takoma Park, Montgomery County, Maryland. The homes feature mid-century modern design. All five houses were constructed in 1951, are identical in their layout and construction, and were designed by Charles M. Goodman. In Goodman's parlance, the house was titled "Unit House No. 1-2L" (presumably, Unit No. 1 with two levels). The houses exhibit the "open floor plan", walls of glass, natural light, cathedral and cantilever ceilings, prominent brick fireplace, cedar wood paneling that was characteristic of all of Goodman's modernist work. This flexible plan facilitated a more casual style of living, and responded to the changing status of women by integrating the kitchen area into the activities of the household.

It was listed on the National Register of Historic Places in 2004.
