= La Laurentienne Building =

Coordinates: 45.4980°N 73.5703°W

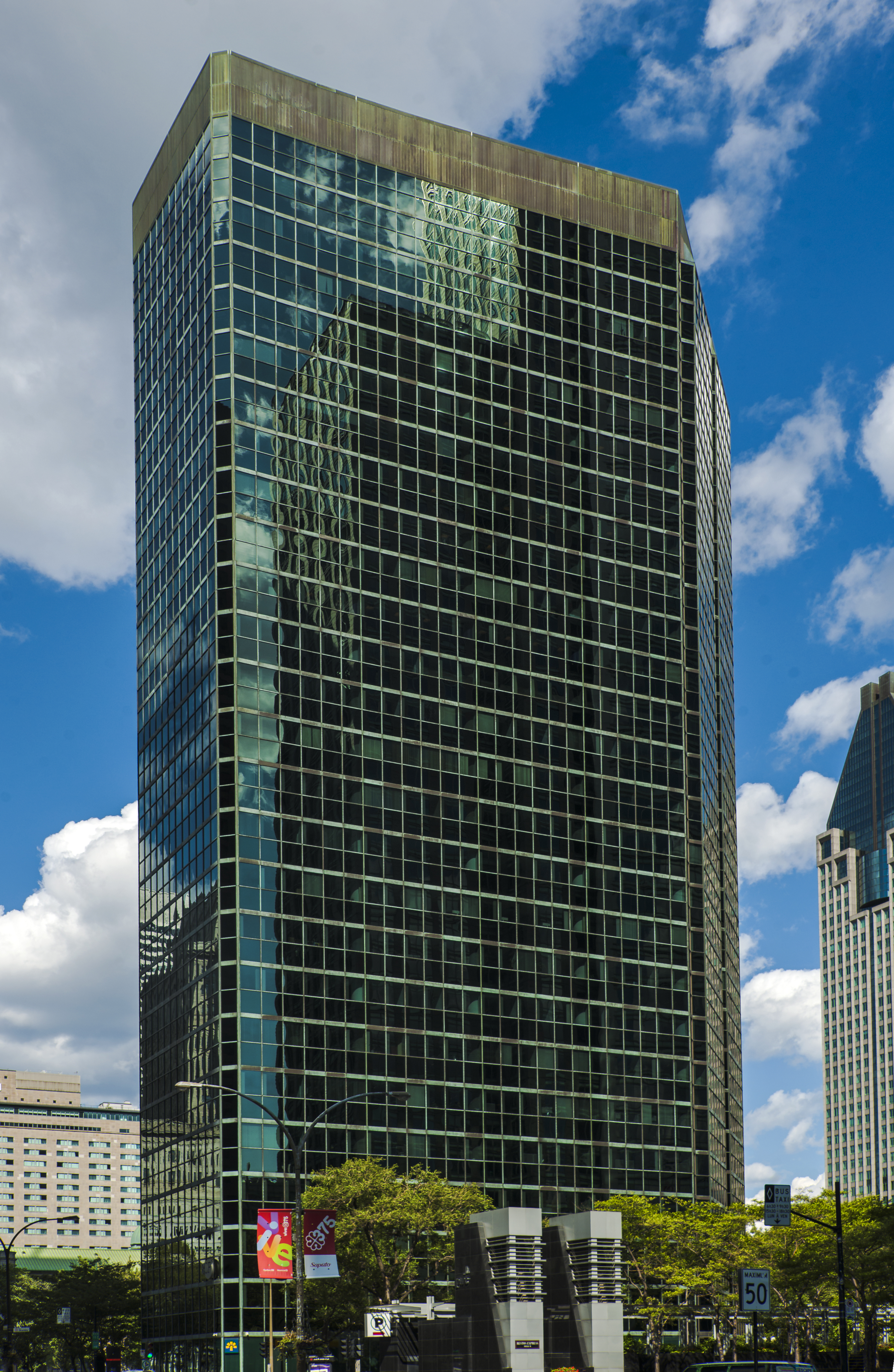
- Interactive map of the La Laurentienne Building area

General information
- Type: Office
- Location: 1100 René-Lévesque Boulevard, Montreal, Quebec, Canada
- Completed: 1986
- Owner: Oxford Properties
- Operator: Oxford Properties

Height
- Roof: 102 metres (335 ft)

Technical details
- Floor count: 27
- Lifts/elevators: 16; Otis Elevonic 401

Design and construction
- Architects: Dimitri Dimakopoulos & Associates

La Laurentienne Building (French: Édifice La Laurentienne) is a 102-metre (335 ft), 27-story skyscraper in Montreal, Quebec, Canada. The building was designed by Dimitri Dimakopoulos & Associates for Marathon Realty, Lavalin and the Laurentian Bank. It is located on René-Lévesque Boulevard at the intersection of Peel Street, in the Ville-Marie borough of Downtown Montreal. It is adjacent to the Bell Centre and the 1250 René-Lévesque skyscraper to the south, and stands on the site of the former Laurentien Hotel.

La Laurentienne Building is currently owned and managed by global real estate investor, developer and owner Oxford Properties. The building's grounds are home to the outdoor bronze sculpture Cactus modulaire.

== Tenants ==
- ADP Canada
- BCF Business Law
- Transcontinental Media

== See also ==
- List of tallest buildings in Montreal
