= Charles Davis Goodman =

Canadian architect (1894–1962)

- Born: 1894; London, England
- Died: 28 April 1962 (aged 67–68)
- Education: McGill University (architecture degree, 1922)
- Occupation: Architect
- Awards: Fellow, Royal Architectural Institute of Canada (elected 1955)
- Buildings: Bens De Luxe Delicatessen & Restaurant; Jewish General Hospital (with J. Cecil McDougall); Hotel Laurentien; Édifice Pascal; Shaare Zion Congregation (synagogue building)

Charles Davis Goodman (1894 – 28 April 1962) was a Jewish-Canadian architect based in Montreal, known for prominent Streamline Moderne (style paquebot) buildings including the Jewish General Hospital, the Hotel Laurentien, and Bens De Luxe Delicatessen & Restaurant.

== Biography ==
Goodman was born in London in 1894. He emigrated to Canada with his family when he was a child. In 1922, he graduated from McGill University with a degree in architecture, having studied in Toronto and Montreal. In the 20th century, he designed a range of commercial and institutional buildings in and around Montreal, including the Lord Beaverbrook Hotel and Laurentian Hotel, the Jewish Public Library (Montreal), and Bens De Luxe Delicatessen & Restaurant. He collaborated with J. Cecil McDougall on the Jewish General Hospital. He was elected a fellow of the Royal Architectural Institute of Canada in 1955.

== Notable works ==
- Bens De Luxe Delicatessen & Restaurant (Montreal)
- Jewish General Hospital (Montreal)
- Hotel Laurentien (Montreal)
- Édifice Pascal (Montreal)
- Shaare Zion Congregation (Montreal)
- Mount Sinai Sanatorium (Quebec)

== Gallery ==
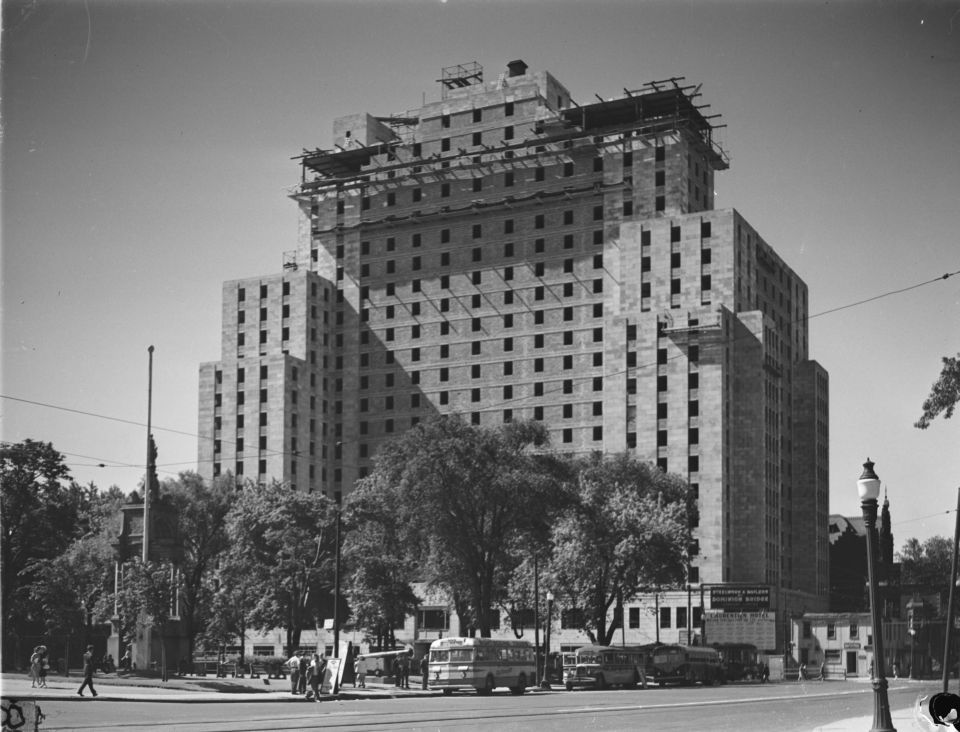
Hotel Laurentien (Montreal)

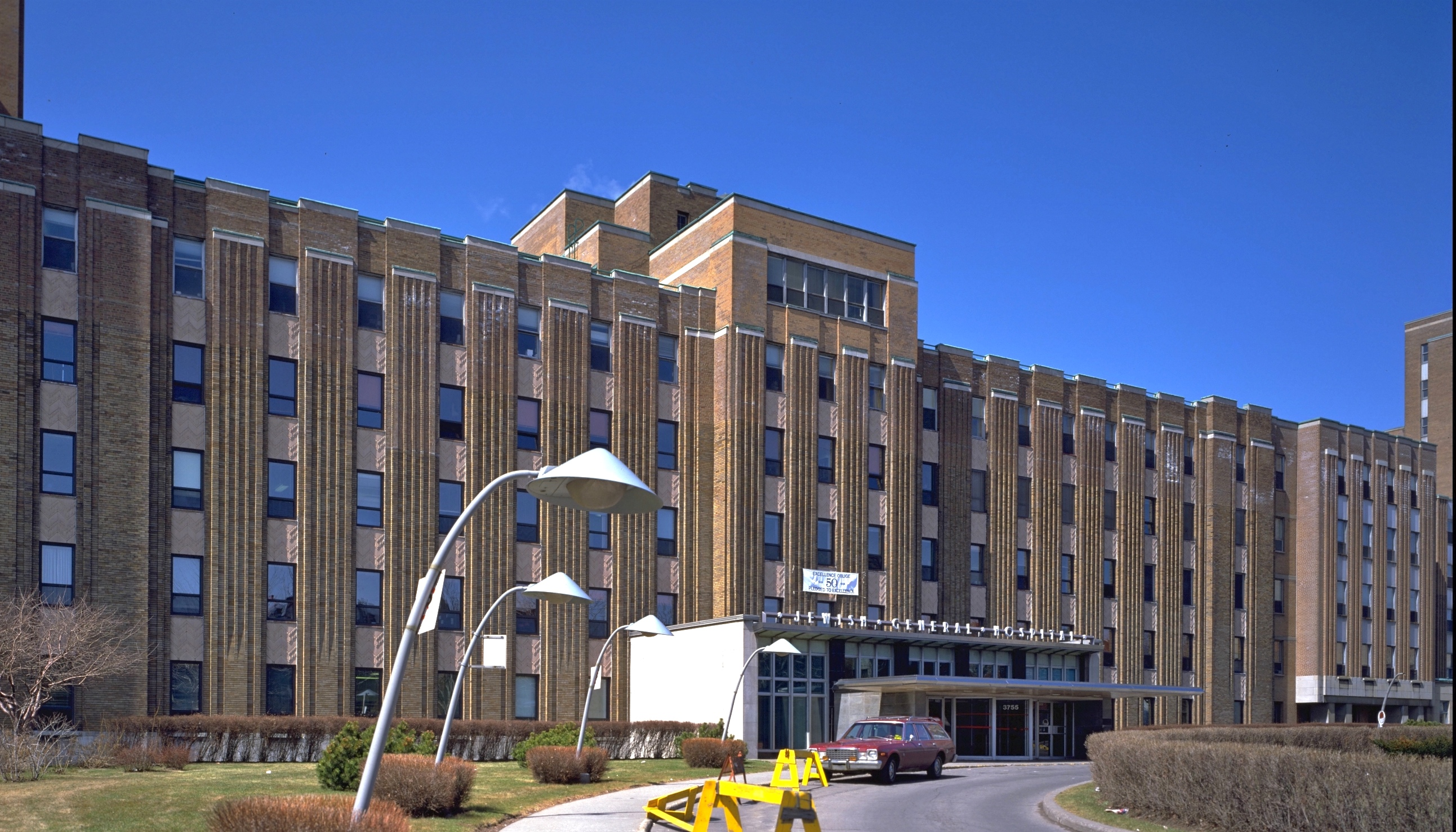
Jewish General Hospital (Montreal)

== See also ==
- Streamline Moderne
- Art Deco
- Architecture of Montreal
