= Woodbourne-Hyde Park, Ohio =

- Former census-designated place
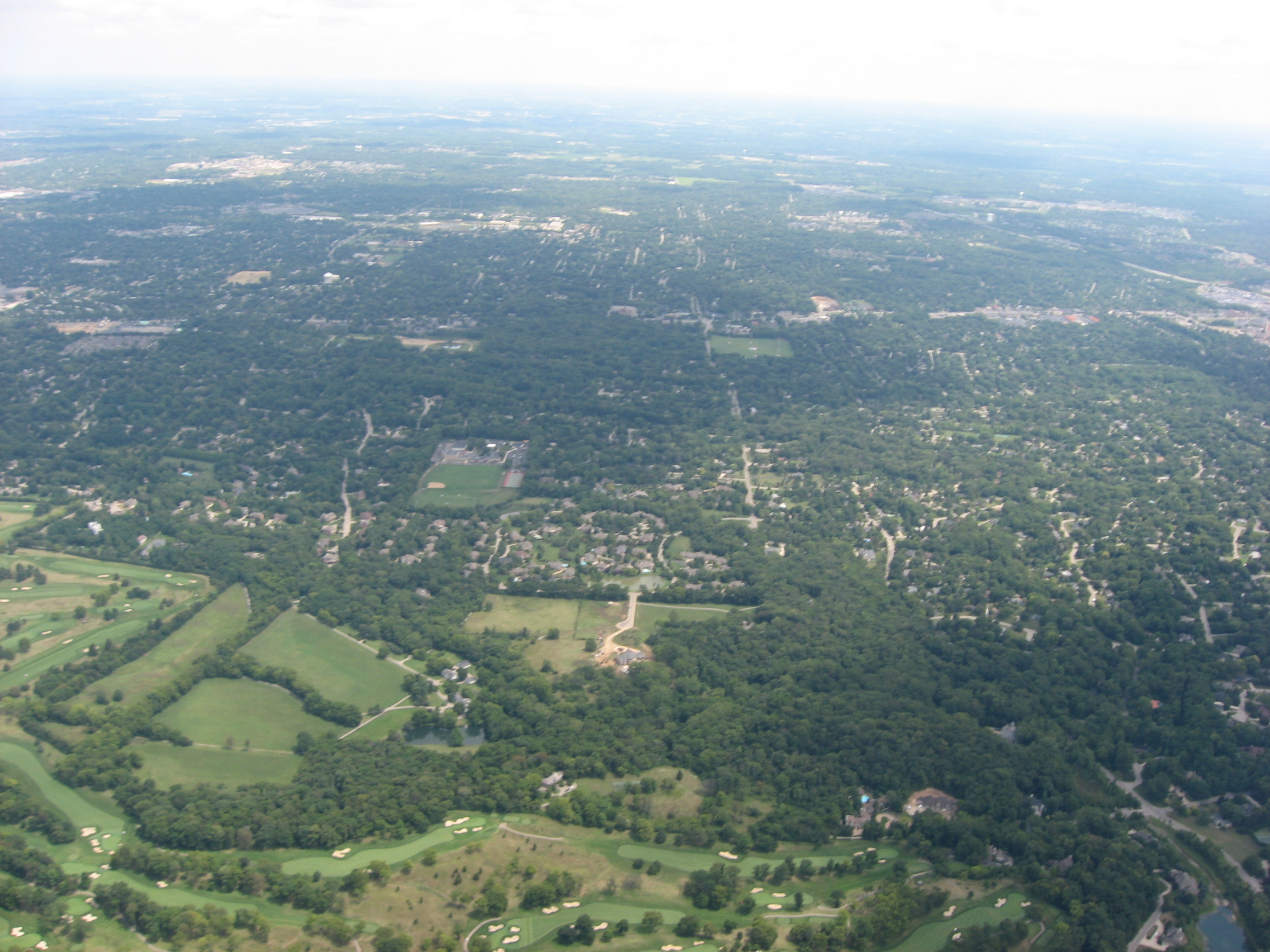
- Aerial view of Woodbourne-Hyde Park

- Location within Ohio Location within the United States
- Coordinates: 39°39′43″N 84°10′30″W
- Country: United States
- State: Ohio
- County: Montgomery
- Township: Washington

Area
  - Total: 4.6 sq mi (11.9 km^{2})
  - Land: 4.6 sq mi (11.9 km^{2})
  - Water: 0 sq mi (0.0 km^{2})
- Elevation: 909 ft (277 m)

Population (2000)
  - Total: 7,910
  - Density: 1,726/sq mi (666.5/km^{2})
- Time zone: UTC-5 (Eastern (EST))
  - Summer (DST): UTC-4 (EDT)
- FIPS code: 39-86331
- GNIS feature ID: 2393866

Woodbourne-Hyde Park is an unincorporated area in Washington Township in Montgomery County, Ohio, United States. it was delineated as a census-designated place (CDP) at the 2000 census, at which time its population was 7,910, but has not been delineated since then.

Woodbourne-Hyde Park is located south of the city of Kettering and is a suburb of Dayton.

== Geography ==
According to the United States Census Bureau, the CDP had a total area of 4.6 square miles (11.9 km^{2}), all land.

== Demographics ==
As of the census of 2000, there were 7,910 people, 2,933 households, and 2,372 families residing in the CDP. The population density was 1,726.3 inhabitants per square mile (666.5/km^{2}). There were 3,020 housing units at an average density of 659.1 per square mile (254.5/km^{2}). The racial makeup of the CDP was 96.09% White, 1.01% African American, 0.08% Native American, 1.85% Asian, 0.23% from other races, and 0.75% from two or more races. Hispanic or Latino of any race were 0.80% of the population.

There were 2,933 households, out of which 29.6% had children under the age of 18 living with them, 74.8% were married couples living together, 4.4% had a female householder with no husband present, and 19.1% were non-families. 17.1% of all households were made up of individuals, and 9.1% had someone living alone who was 65 years of age or older. The average household size was 2.53 and the average family size was 2.85.

In the CDP the population had the following spread: 21.6% under the age of 18, 3.3% from 18 to 24, 19.8% from 25 to 44, 30.3% from 45 to 64, and 25.0% who were 65 years of age or older. The median age was 48 years. For every 100 females, there were 91.0 males. For every 100 females age 18 and over, there were 86.5 males.

The median income for a household in the CDP was $80,041, and the median income for a family was $87,654. Males had a median income of $61,541 versus $37,537 for females. The per capita income for the CDP was $38,052. About 1.1% of families and 2.1% of the population were below the poverty line, including 4.6% of those under age 18 and 1.2% of those age 65 or over.
