= Charles M. Goodman =

American architect (1906–1992)

Charles Morton Goodman FAIA
- Born: November 26, 1906; New York City, US
- Died: October 29, 1992 (aged 85); Alexandria, Virginia, US
- Resting place: Ivy Hill Cemetery, Alexandria
- Education: Chicago School of Architecture of the Armour Institute (1934)
- Occupation: Architect
- Years active: 1934–1986
- Spouse(s): Charlotte Kathleen Dodge (m. 1934, d. 1979); Dorothy Mae Sopchick (m. 1980, d. 2013)
- Children: 1
- Awards: AIA National Award of Merit
- Practice: Charles M. Goodman Associates
- Buildings: Charles M. Goodman House, Unitarian Universalist Church of Arlington, Hawthorne School
- Projects: Alcoa House, The Commons, Hickory Cluster, Hollin Hills, National Homes Corp., River Park, Rock Creek Palisades, United States Post Offices, the Unitarian Church of Arlington, Washington, D.C., Southwest Urban Renewal, Washington National Airport, Westgate and Westpark Research Parks

Charles M. Goodman FAIA (November 26, 1906 – October 29, 1992) was an American architect who made a name for his modern designs in suburban Washington, D.C., after World War II. While his work has a regional feel, he ignored the Colonial Revival look so popular in Virginia. Goodman was quoted in the 1968 survey book Architecture in Virginia as saying that he aimed to "get away from straight historical reproduction."

Goodman, who developed preliminary designs for Washington National Airport and served as main architect of the Hollin Hills neighborhood in Alexandria, Virginia, attended the Illinois Institute of Technology. He came to D.C. in 1934 to work as the designing architect in the Public Buildings Administration. He later served as head architect at the United States Treasury Department and the Air Transport Command. After World War II he worked closely with Robert C. Davenport designing and site planning most of the Hollin Hills, where his firm, Charles M. Goodman Associates, designed over 14 models of house.

During the 1950s and 1960s, Goodman designed prefabricated homes for the National Homes Corporation of Lafayette, Indiana. It is estimated more than 325,000 homes throughout the United States were built using his National Homes’ designs. Such as “The Ranger”, “The Main Line”, “The Custom Line”, and “The Cadet”.

== Personal life ==
Goodman was born as Charles Morton Goldman in New York City. Historian Elizabeth Jo Lampl identifies his parents as "Polish immigrants Harris Goldman and Jennie Blomsten," and notes that "Goodman's transcript from the Armour Institute of Technology records that he entered that program as Charles M. Goldman, but changed his name in 1934 to Charles M. Goodman."

He attended the University of Illinois from 1925 to 1928. At the Armour Institute, he was awarded the Dankmar Adler Prize as an outstanding freshman, and the Hutchinson medal as the leading senior in architecture, and a fellowship at Lake Forest foundation. (The Lake Forest Foundation award listed him as "Charles M. Goldman.") He graduated in 1934 from Amour Institute's School of Architecture.

In June 1934, he married Charlotte Kathleen Dodge and they had one daughter together. She died in 1979 and he married Dorothy Mae Sopchick on October 30, 1980.

== Projects ==
=== Residential structures ===
Beyond his most known works at Hollin Hills and National Airport, his other notable projects included the 1964 Unitarian Church in Arlington, Virginia, at 4444 Arlington Blvd. His residence, Goodman House, was built in 1954 at 510 Quaker Lane in Alexandria. In Reston, he designed a "cluster" of townhouses in the woods above Lake Anne known as Hickory Cluster.

His 1949-51 development at Silver Spring, Maryland, was listed on the National Register of Historic Places (NRHP) in 2004 as the Hammond Wood Historic District. His 1951 development at Takoma Park, Maryland, was listed on the NRHP in 2004 as the Takoma Avenue Historic District. His 1958–1961 development at Silver Spring, Maryland, was listed on NRHP, and is known as the Rock Creek Woods Historic District. He also designed 21 twin dwellings in the High Point section of the Virginia Heights Historic District.

In 1957, Alcoa approached Goodman to design and build 50 Alcoa Care-free Homes; one in each state. Due to project difficulties, only 24 were built in 16 states including NRHP-designated properties of Alcoa Care-free Home (Brighton, New York) and one within Hollin Hills Historic District.

In 1962, Reynolds Aluminum approached the noted architect to develop River Park townhomes along the Southwest Waterfront community of Washington, D.C., and just north of Fort McNair between N and O Streets and Delaware Avenue and 4th Street, SW. Goodman designed the glass and aluminum clad River Park Mutual Homes, which consists of two conjoined high-rise buildings and several clusters of flat and barrel-roof top townhouses.

In the mid-1960s Goodman created one of his largest projects, the Houston House Apartments, a 31-story apartment complex in downtown Houston, Texas.

Locations receiving National Register of Historic Places (NRHP) designation and time of significance include:

- Nationwide significance:
  - Hollin Hills Historic District (1949–1971), Alexandria, Virginia (2013)
- Statewide significance:
  - Charles M. Goodman House (1954), Alexandria, Virginia (2013)
  - Tauxemont Historic District (1954), Alexandria, Virginia (2006)
  - Subdivisions and Architecture Planned and Designed by Charles M. Goodman Associates in Montgomery County, Maryland (Multiple Property Document)
  - Moyaone Reserve Historic District, Thomas-Straus (Contributing Building), Accokeek, Maryland (2020)
- Local significance:
  - Virginia Heights Historic District (1946–1947, 1950), Arlington, Virginia (2008)
  - Hammond Wood Historic District (1949), Silver Spring, Maryland (2004)
  - Rock Creek Woods Historic District (1958–1961), Silver Spring, Maryland (2004)
  - Takoma Avenue Historic District (1951–52), Takoma Park, Maryland (2004)
  - Unitarian Universalist Church of Arlington (1964), Arlington, Virginia (2014)
  - Alcoa Care-free Home (1958), Brighton, New York (2010)
- Under review as future NRHP historic district
  - Hickory Cluster (90 townhouses) (1965), Reston, Virginia

=== Post offices and federal buildings ===
Upon graduation, Goodman worked as an architect within the Public Buildings Administration (the precursor to today's Public Buildings Service of the U.S. General Services Administration, often with Louis A. Simon and Howard Lovewell Cheney, designing federal buildings, including:

- F. Edward Hébert Federal Building: New Orleans, Louisiana
- Federal Building at the 1939 New York World's Fair
- U.S. Post Office: Chicago, Illinois:
  - Englewood Station
  - Logan Square
  - Roseland Station
  - Uptown Postal Station
- U.S. Post Office: Covington, Kentucky: Post Office and Court House
- U.S. Post Office: Detroit, Michigan:
  - Highland Park Branch
  - New Fairview Station
- U.S. Post Office: Evanston, Illinois
- U.S. Post Office: Flushing, New York: Forest Hills Station
- U.S. Post Office: Granville, Ohio
- U.S. Post Office: Kansas City, Kansas
- U.S. Post Office: Saint Joseph, Michigan

== Awards and honors ==
In 1951 he was named Architect of the Year from the Southwest Research Institute (SwRI) for Hollin Hills, one of many awards the community and his home designs would garner over the years. In 1959, he was made a Fellow of the American Institute of Architects (FAIA). One year later, Goodman was awarded the 1960 Gold Medal from the Art Directors Club of Washington.

Goodman was one of eight architects honored as ‘’The People’s Architect’’ by Rice University to commemorate its semi-centennial, 1912–1962. Other awardees include: John Lyon Reid, O'Neil Ford, Victor Gruen, I. M. Pei, Vernon DeMars, Pietro Belluschi, and Marshall Shaffer.

In July–August 1982, the AIA Virginia Society's "Outstanding Recognition Award" went to Charles M. Goodman, FAIA. He was cited for the consistent excellence and enduring quality of his design work. Of special note was Goodman's design for Hollin Hills, 450 contemporary single-family homes set in a wooded environment south of Alexandria. Begun in 1946, Hollin Hills received the inaugural award of the Virginia Society, AlA's Test-of Time Award the previous year in 1981. Other Goodman buildings lauded at the presentation were Reston's Hickory Cluster Town Houses, the Unitarian Church of Arlington and numerous buildings in the Westgate Research Park, near Tysons Corner, for which he provided the original land planning.

In 1986, he received the Professional Achievement Award of the IIT Alumni Association.

== Gallery ==
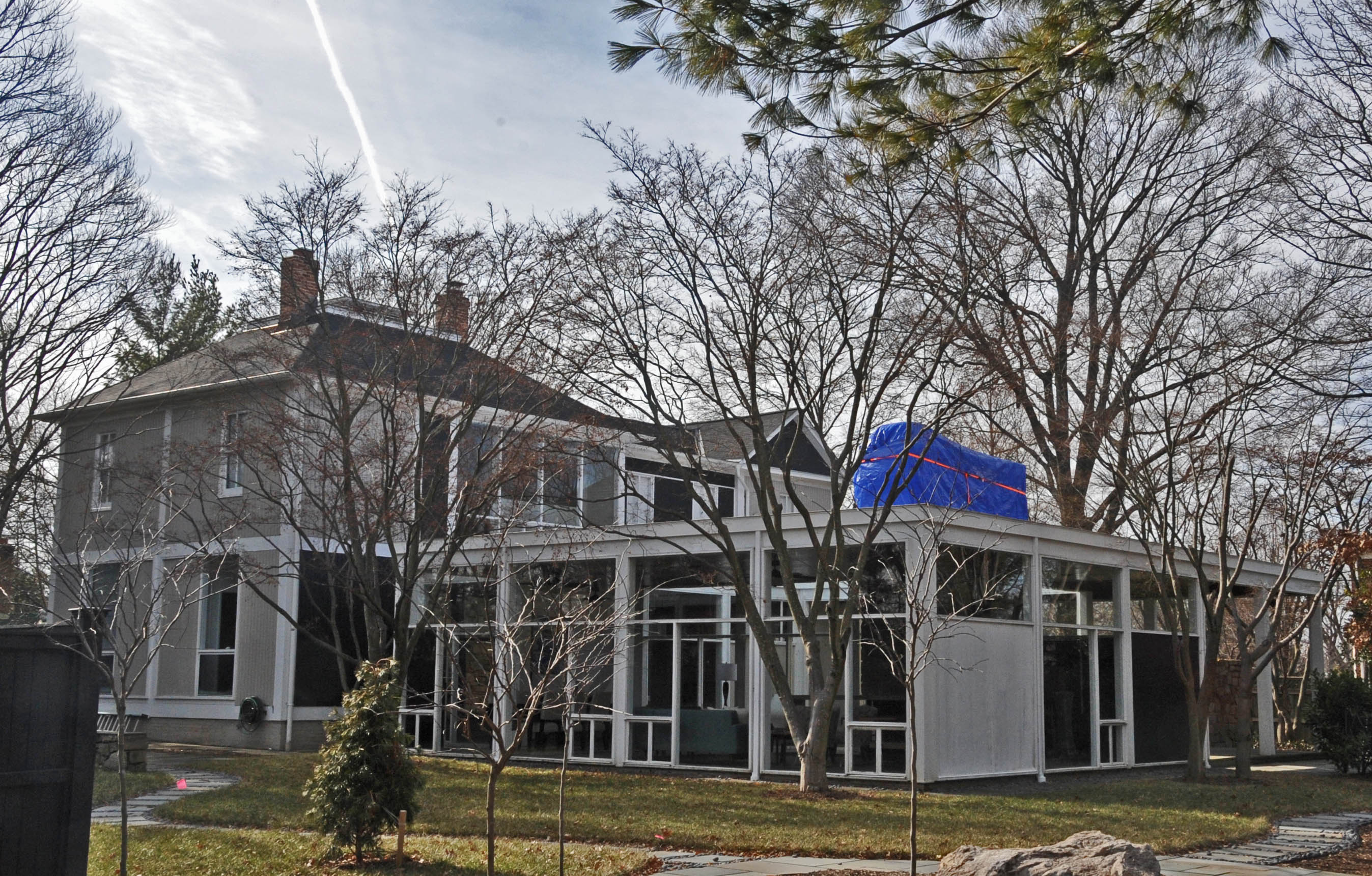
Charles M. Goodman House, listed on the National Register of Historic Places (NRHP)

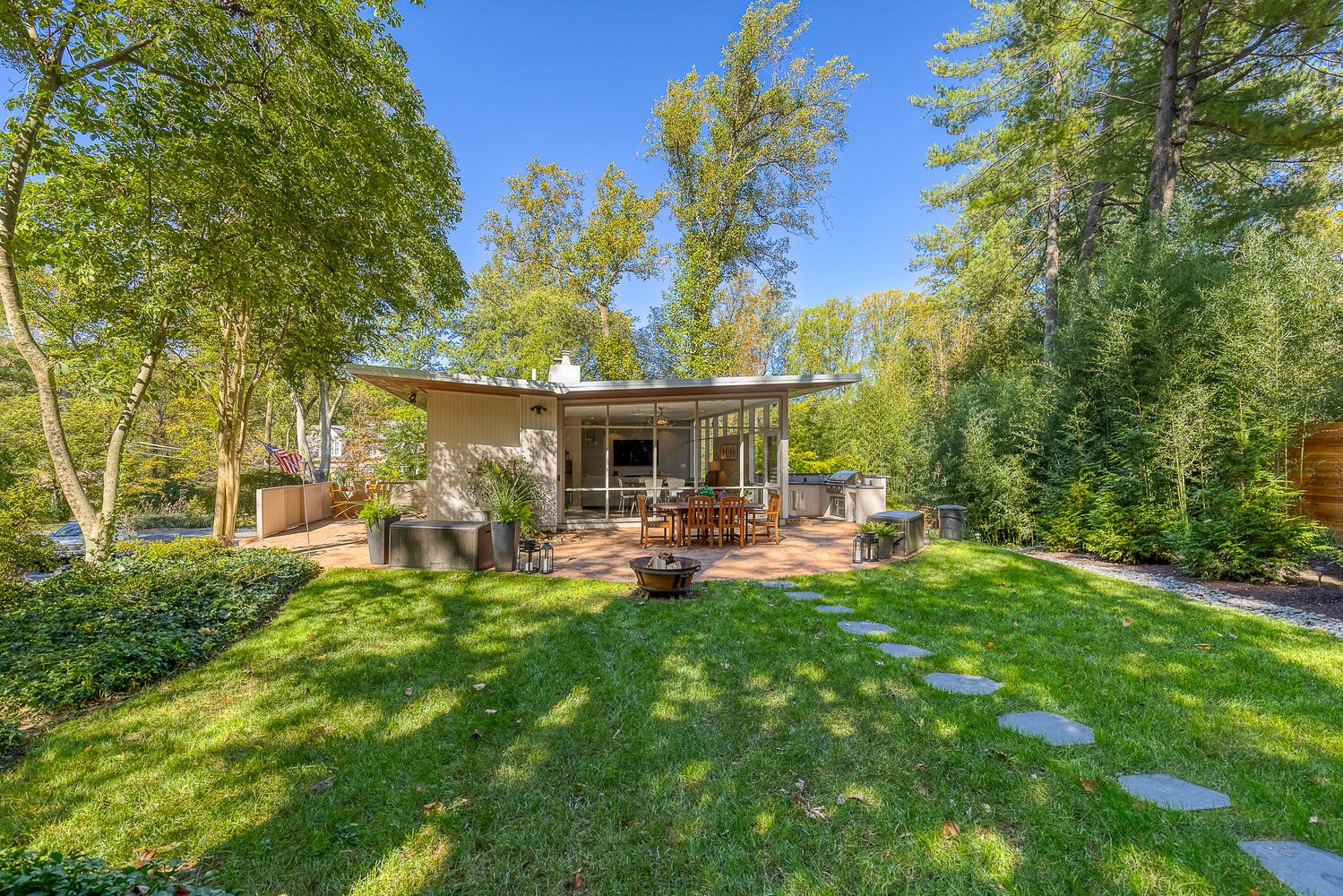
Charles M. Goodman House

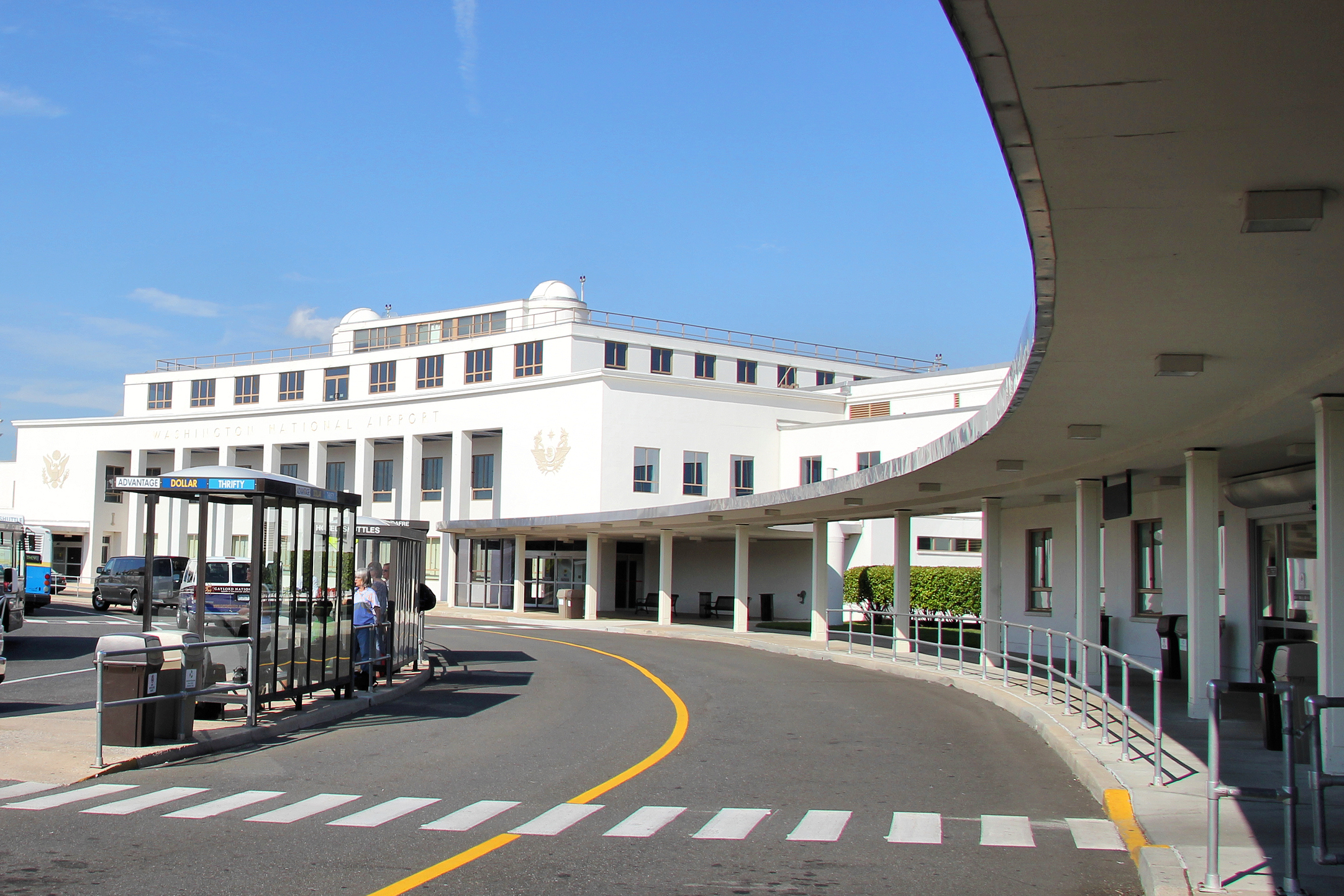
National Airport, now known as Ronald Reagan Washington National Airport

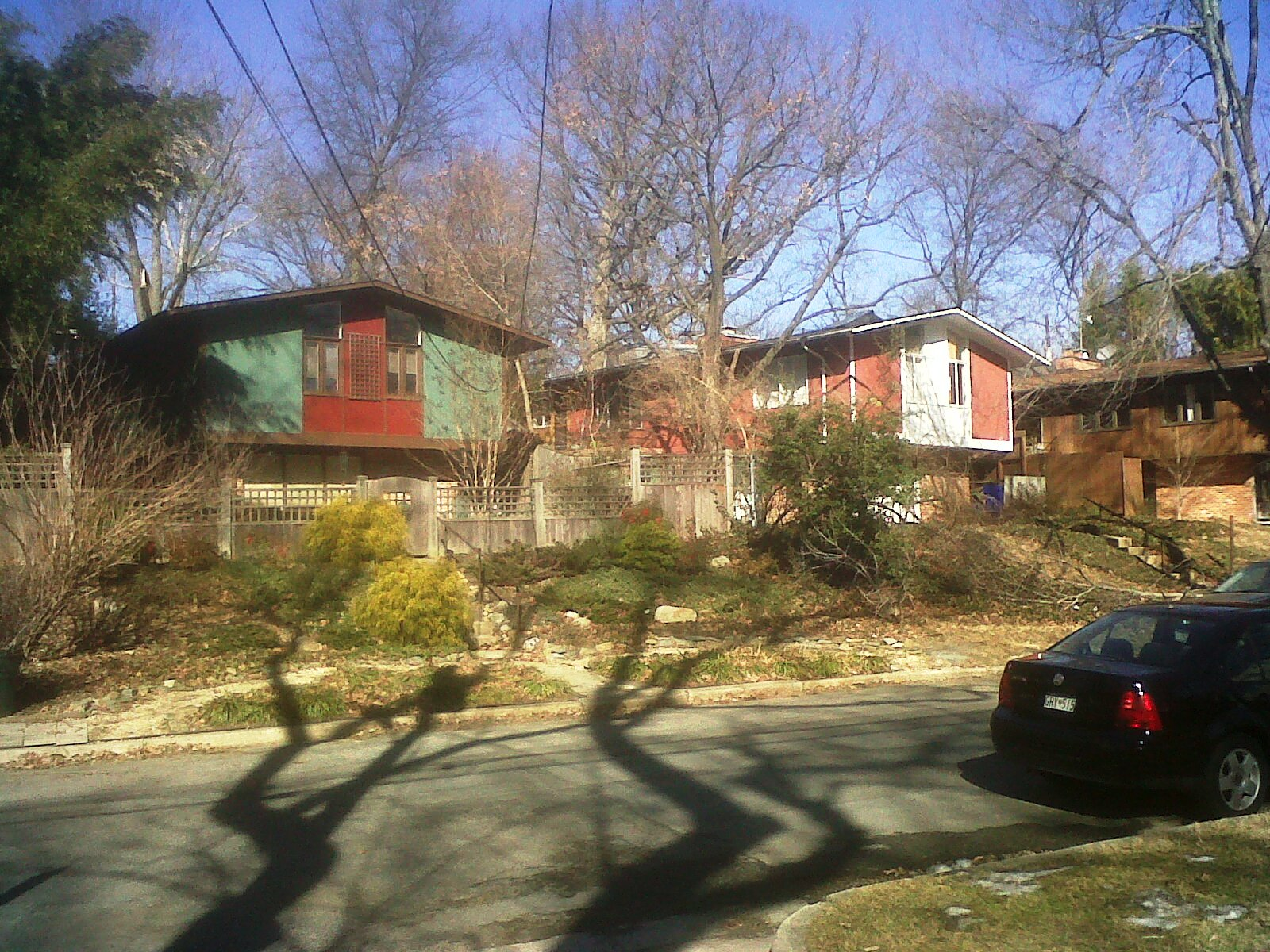
Houses in the Takoma Avenue Historic District

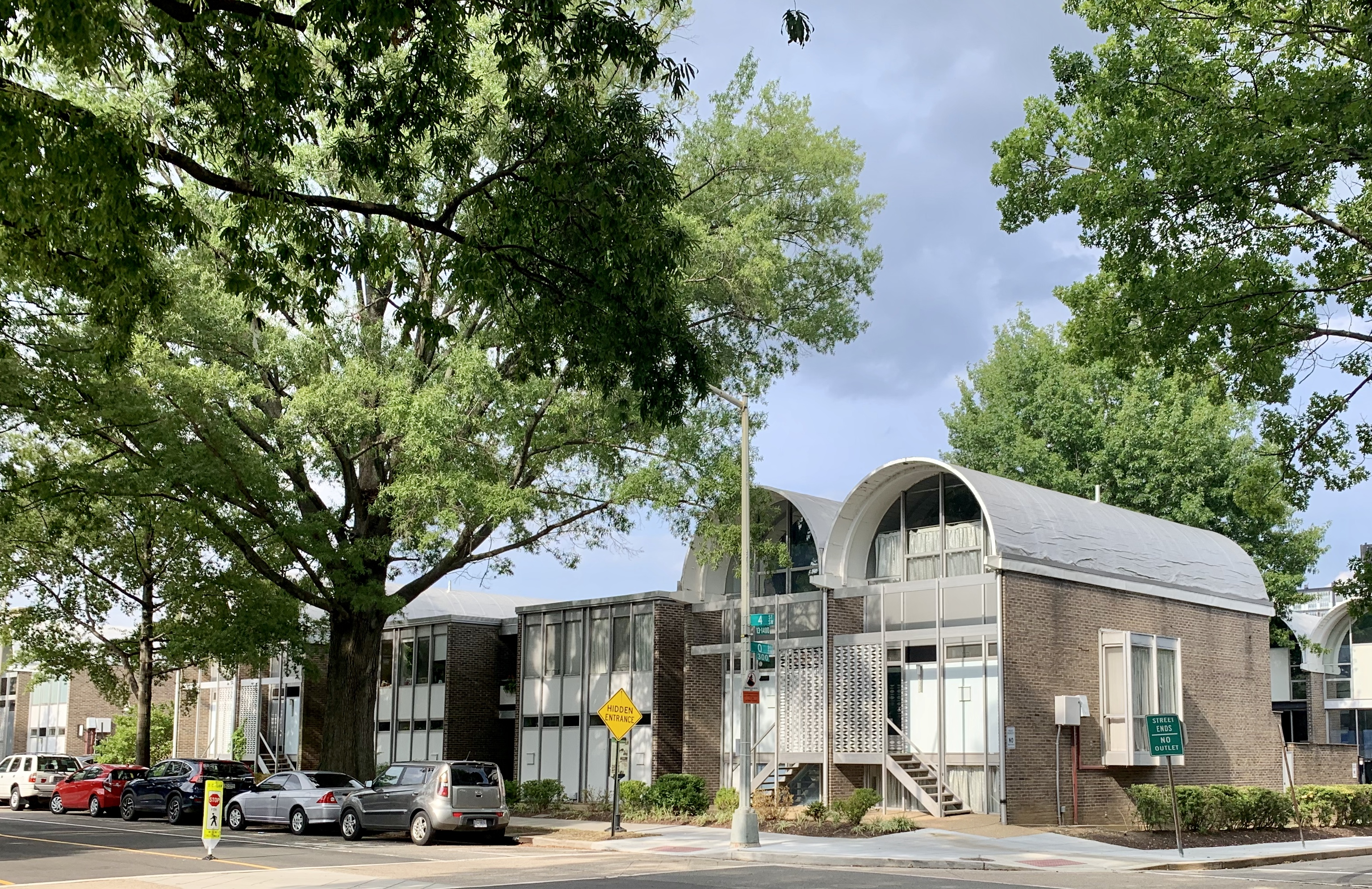
Barrel-roof townhouses in the Southwest Waterfront neighborhood of Washington, D.C.

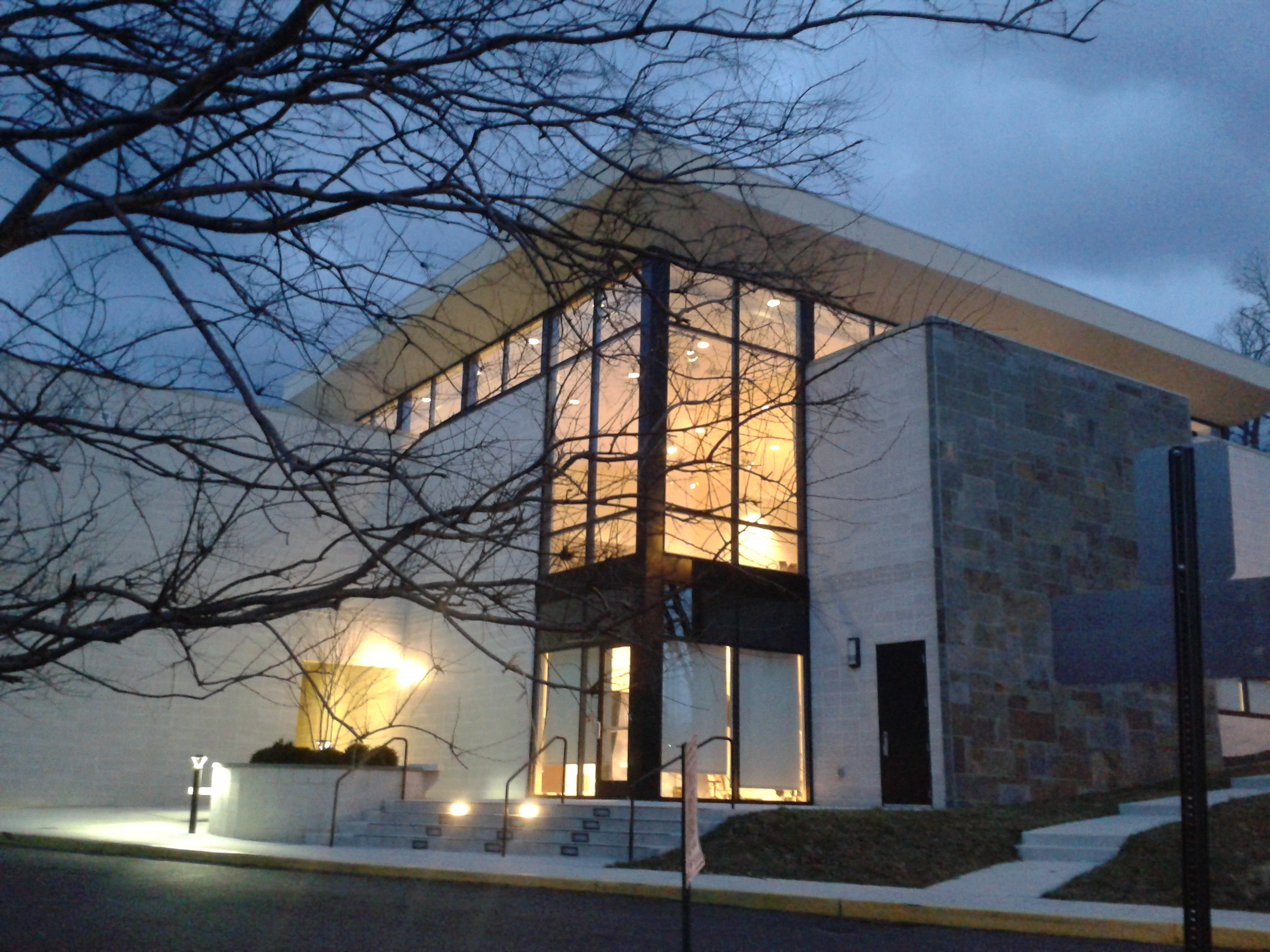
Unitarian Universalist Church of Arlington is listed on the NRHP

== Bibliography ==
- Goodman, Charles M. And Von Eckardt, Wolf; Life for dead spaces: the development of the Lavanburg Commons: An architectural proposal by Charles Goodman, and text by Wolf Von Eckardt. 1st ed. Published for the Fred L. Lavanburg Foundation by Harcourt, Brace & World New York 1963 [1963].
