= Charles M. Goodman House =

Historic house in Virginia, United States

- U.S. National Register of Historic Places
- Virginia Landmarks Register
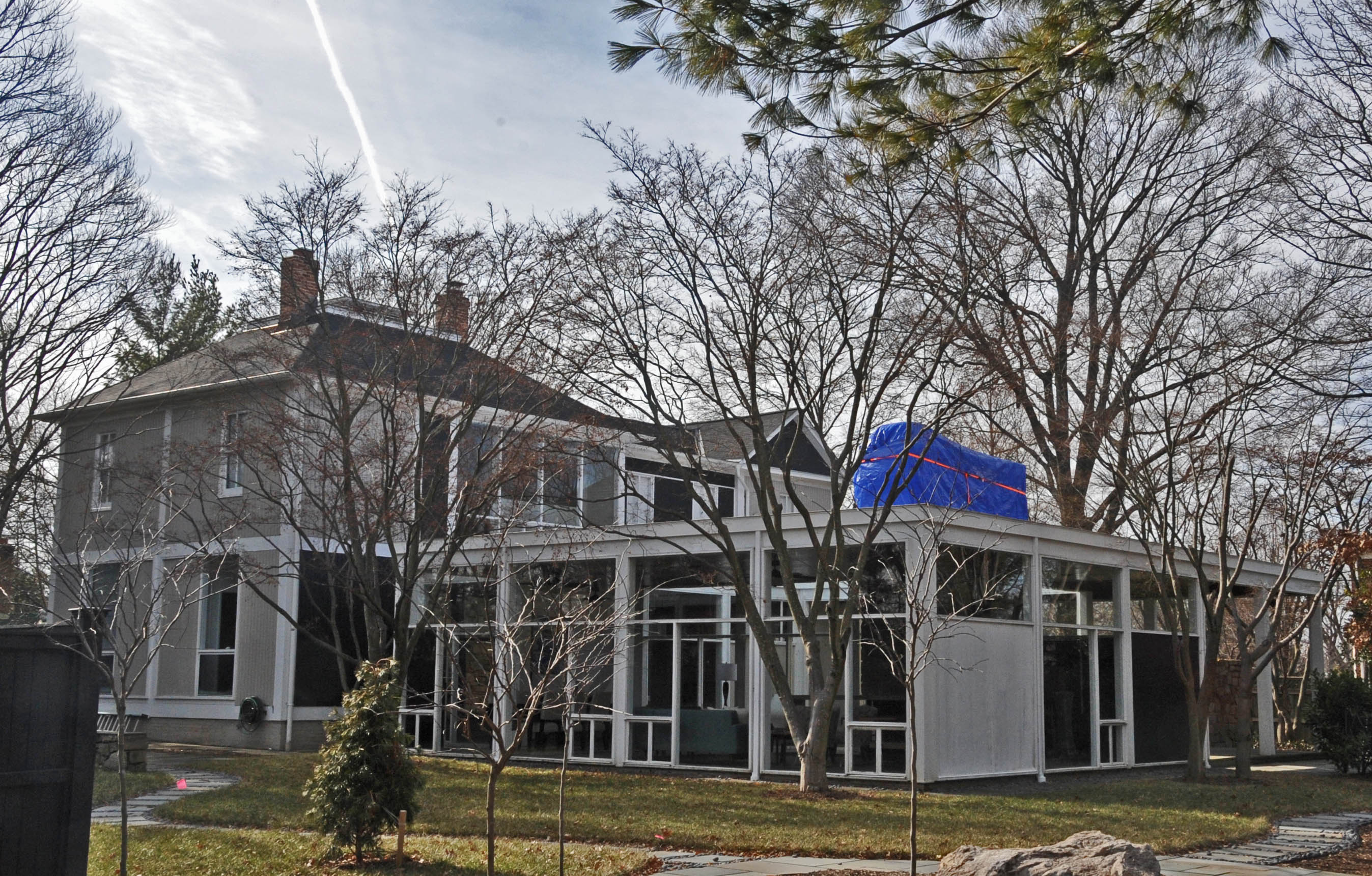
- Charles M. Goodman House, July 2007

- Location within Alexandria Location within Northern Virginia Location within Virginia Location within the United States
- Location: 510 N. Quaker Ln., Alexandria, Virginia
- Coordinates: 38°48′51″N 77°05′23″W
- Area: 0.613 acres (0.248 ha)
- Built: c. 1875, 1954
- Architect: Goodman, Charles M.
- Architectural style: Victorian, International Style
- NRHP reference No.: 13000334
- VLR No.: 100-5265

Significant dates
- Added to NRHP: May 28, 2013
- Designated VLR: March 21, 2013

Charles M. Goodman House is a historic home located at Alexandria, Virginia. It consists of a two-story 1870s Victorian-era farmhouse with an unusual International Style addition designed by architect Charles M. Goodman in 1954. Also on the property are the contributing stone-lined well (c. 1870s), a wooden fence (1954), and discontinuous low stone walls (1954).

It was listed on the National Register of Historic Places in 2013.
