= Hollindale, Virginia =

Unincorporated community in Virginia, United States

- Unincorporated community
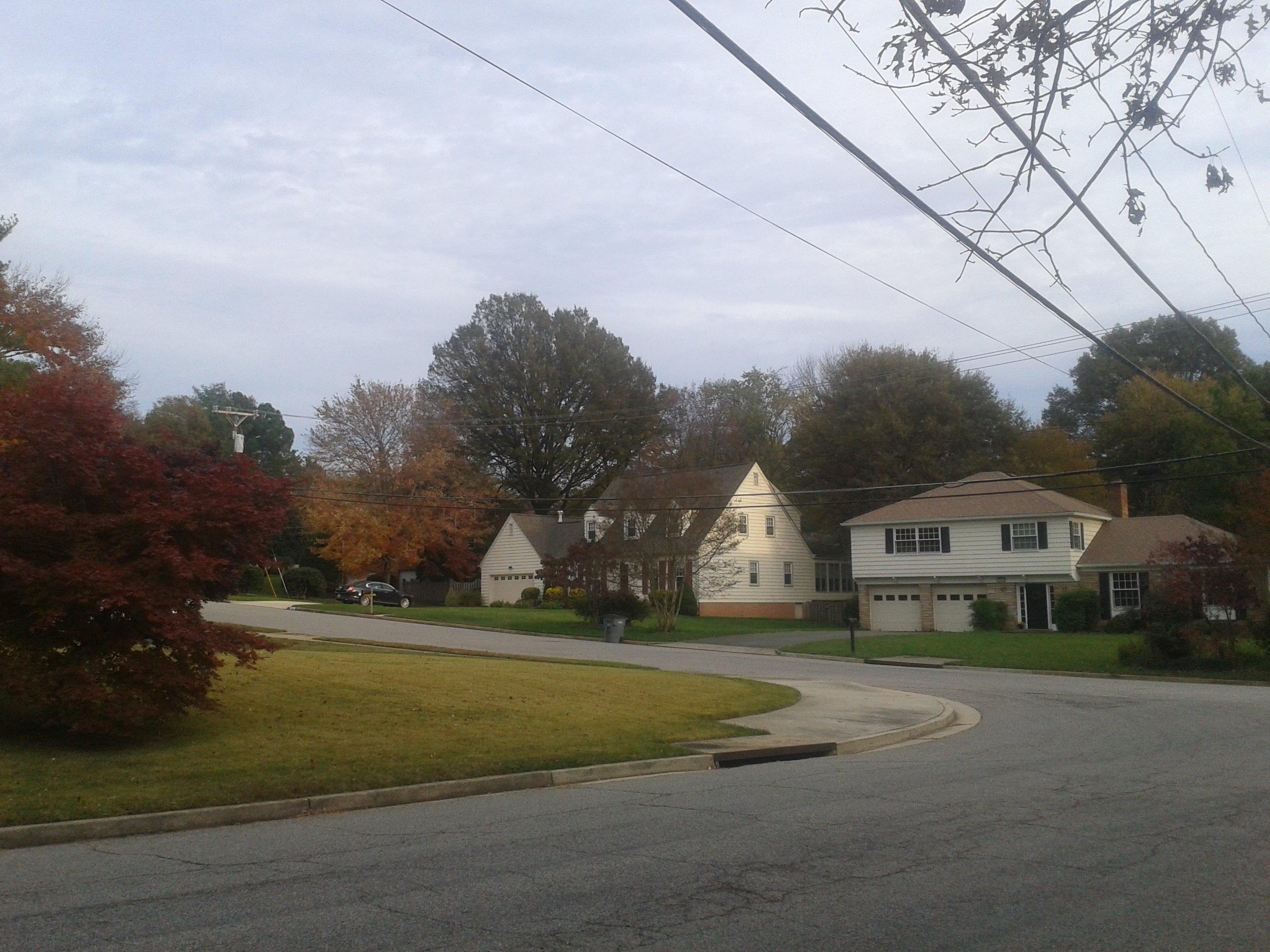
- Houses in Hollindale, November, 2014

- Location within Northern Virginia Location within Virginia Location within the United States
- Coordinates: 38.749640°N 77.071639°W
- Country: United States
- County: Fairfax
- Established: 1953

Area
  - Total: 0.507 sq mi (1.31 km^{2})
- Elevation: 121 ft (37 m)

Population (2013)
  - Total: 945
- Time zone: UTC-5 (Eastern (EST))
  - Summer (DST): UTC-4 (EDT)
- Area code: 703
- FIPS code: 51-37832
- GNIS feature ID: 1493095

Hollindale is an unincorporated community in Fort Hunt, Fairfax County, Virginia, United States, close to the George Washington Memorial Parkway in ZIP code 22306. As of 2013, it had 945 residents. Mount Vernon Presbyterian Church and Hollin Meadows Elementary School are located within the community. Hollindale is set along the hilly woodlands across from the Potomac. It was built around several estates and on what used to be Sherwood Dairy Farm, and is adjacent to the Hollin Hills community. It is dominated by mid-century modern homes, colonials, and Tudors.

== History ==
The name "Hollindale" is a combination of "Hollin" and the word "dale" which means valley, reflecting the neighborhood's rural ambiance. The neighborhood was built on a portion of the Hollin Hall plantation, which had belonged to George Mason and his family. The land had once been used as a fort to protect early settlers in Virginia from Native American attacks, yet as the years went on, it developed into a family estate and farm which Mason had passed down to his son, Thomson, in 1781. Both Thomson and his wife lived on the land, which was situated three miles south of Alexandria on Little Hunting Creek, until 1820. After Thomson Mason's death, the land was placed on sale, yet was unable to be purchased immediately after a terrible fire had destroyed all but the spinning house, or "Little Hollin Hall." However, Mr. Edward Curtis Gibbs, a Quaker seafarer, became its new owner in 1852.

"In 1919, Mr. and Mrs. Harley Wilson bought the plantation whereupon they began making many changes...In 1935 Mr. Wilson died, leaving the building vacant for some time. Mr. and Mrs. Merle Thorpe bought it during World War II, and it stayed in their possession until Mount Vernon Unitarian Church bought the house and the surrounding the buildings in 1958."

In 1958, the subdivision Hollin Brook Park was finished along Sherwood Hall Lane just across from what was the Thorpe turkey farm. The Sherwood Dairy Farm continued until later developments of the neighborhood. In 1965, a modern home in the neighborhood was featured in the Better Homes and Gardens magazine.

In 1974, President Gerald Ford appointed Hollindale resident Jerald terHorst as his press secretary. After a month, terHorst famously resigned because of Ford's pardoning of Nixon. Before terHorst's resignation Ford would occasionally ride down Evening Lane in Hollindale to visit his friend. On September 8, 1979, Hollindale, which had been undergoing construction since 1953 as a part of the post-World War II suburban-development project in Fairfax County, was recognized by the U.S. Geological Survey as a populated place. In 1984, resident and World War II veteran Captain Archibald McEwan helped found the Technology Advancement Group. In early 2010 first lady Michelle Obama visited the Hollin Meadows Elementary School. The University of Virginia has collected data in its library from Alexandria, Virginia concerning the Sherwood Dairy Farm.

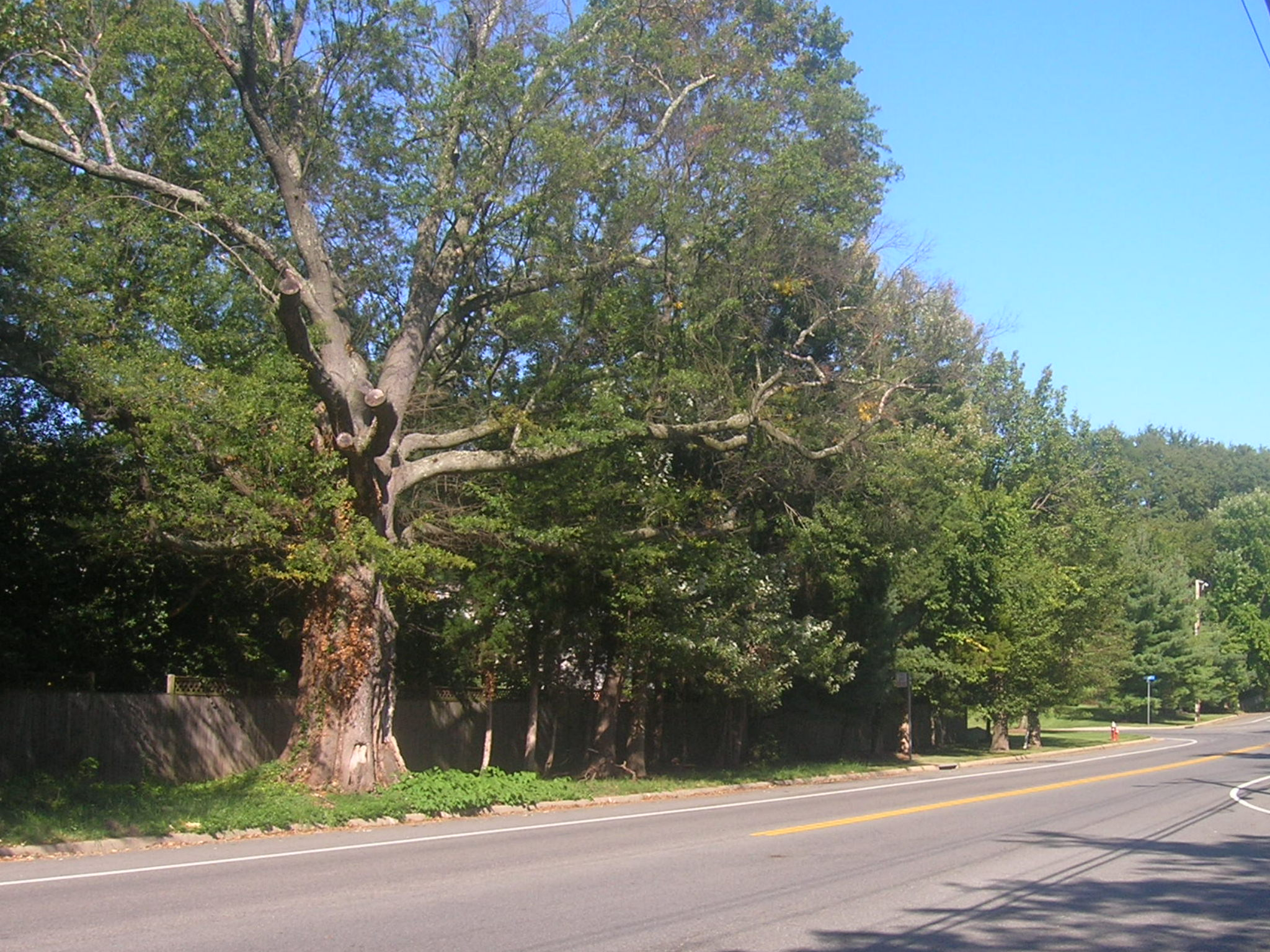
The oldest tree in Fairfax County on Sherwood Hall Lane.

=== Civic association ===
Hollindale, like all neighboring communities, has a civic association headed by resident Mike McPherson who serves as president of the board of governors. The association is part of the Mount Vernon District Civic Associations and governs the neighborhood along with a small portion of Sherwood Hall Lane which runs through it.

== Geography ==
Hollindale is located at 38°45′03″N 77°03′48″W (38.750948, -77.063311).

As of 2007, the community has a total area of 0.507 square miles (1.3 square kilometers).

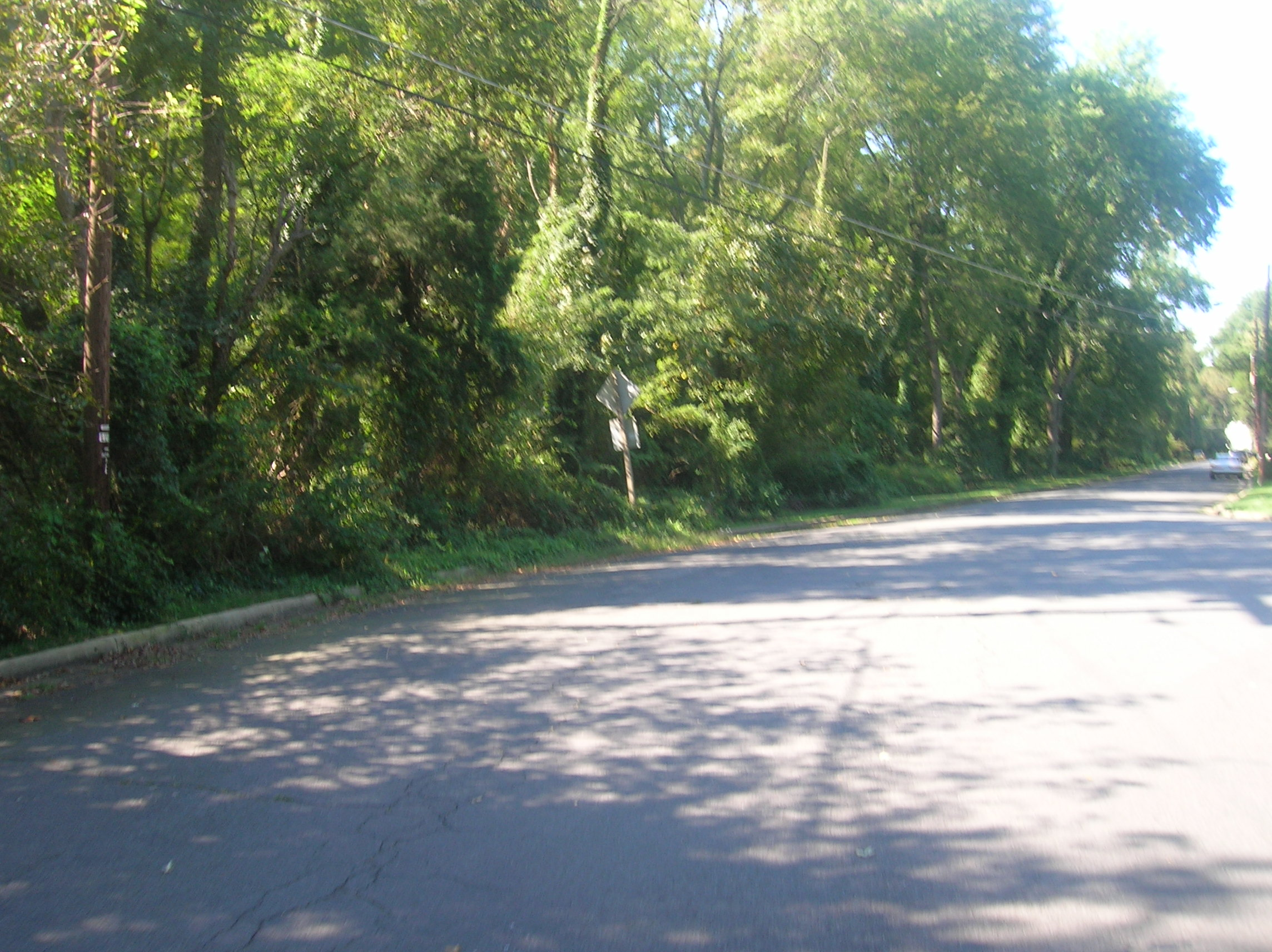
Paul Springs Stream Valley Park

=== Official location ===
According to the United States Postal Service, Hollindale, along with surrounding neighborhoods, is listed with an Alexandria, Virginia address despite it being part of Fairfax County. The community belongs to the district of Mount Vernon, and is bordered by Fort Hunt Road to the east and the Paul Springs Stream Valley Park, which it shares with straddling community Hollin Hall Village, to the west and south. To the north the neighborhood intertwines with the nationally recognized community of Hollin Hills.

== Demographics ==
As of 2009, there were 926 people in the community. The population density was 1,827 residents per square mile. The racial makeup of the community was 91.3% White, 0.4% African American, 2.8% Asian, 0.9% Pacific Islander, 0.9% from other races, and 2.5% from two or more races. Hispanic or Latino of any race were 1.4% of the population.

The percentage of married couples was 78.9%. The percentage of married couples with children was 30.3%. Percentage of single mothers was 1.9%. The average house size was 2.6 people, and the average family size was 2.9 members.

In the community, 21.3% of the population was under the age of 18, and 18.6% was 65 years of age or older. The median age was 37.9 years. Males made up 48% of the community and females made up 52%.

The median household income in the community was $158,577 and the per capita income was $76,351.

== Real estate ==
For real estate purposes there are three sub-divisions within Hollindale including Hollindale, Kirkside, and Hollin Brook Park. The majority of homes in Hollindale were built in the mid-twentieth century. The homes are of either Tudor, federal, colonial, or traditional styles. There are six mansions/estates located within Hollindale including "Little Hollin Hall." Most homes lie on wooded, hilly lots and are spacious.

== Education ==
Hollindale residents are zoned to Fairfax County Public Schools. There are two public elementary schools, Waynewood and Hollin Meadows, which the neighborhood falls under. The public junior high school is Carl Sandburg Middle School, and the public high school is West Potomac High School. Residents of Hollindale also attend the nearby Thomas Jefferson High School for Science and Technology, ranked the #1 high school in the nation by U.S. News & World Report.

Several private schools, ranging from pre-school to 12th grade, are located in nearby Alexandria, including St. Stephens & St. Agnes School, Episcopal High School, and Bishop Ireton.

=== Original schools ===
The original elementary school of Hollindale, aside from Waynewood, was the Hollin Hills Elementary School. Hollin Meadows on Nordok Lane in Hollindale became the new elementary school circa forty years ago. The original high school, Fort Hunt High School, combined with Groveton High School to form West Potomac in 1985.

=== Athletics ===
Hollindale falls under the Fort Hunt Youth Athletic Association. The program includes sports ranging from baseball to lacrosse; resident children play against neighboring Alexandria and Woodlawn Little Leagues in the area.

== Notable person ==
- Jerald terHorst, former press-secretary for Gerald Ford and author
