= Hybla Valley, Virginia =

- Census-designated place
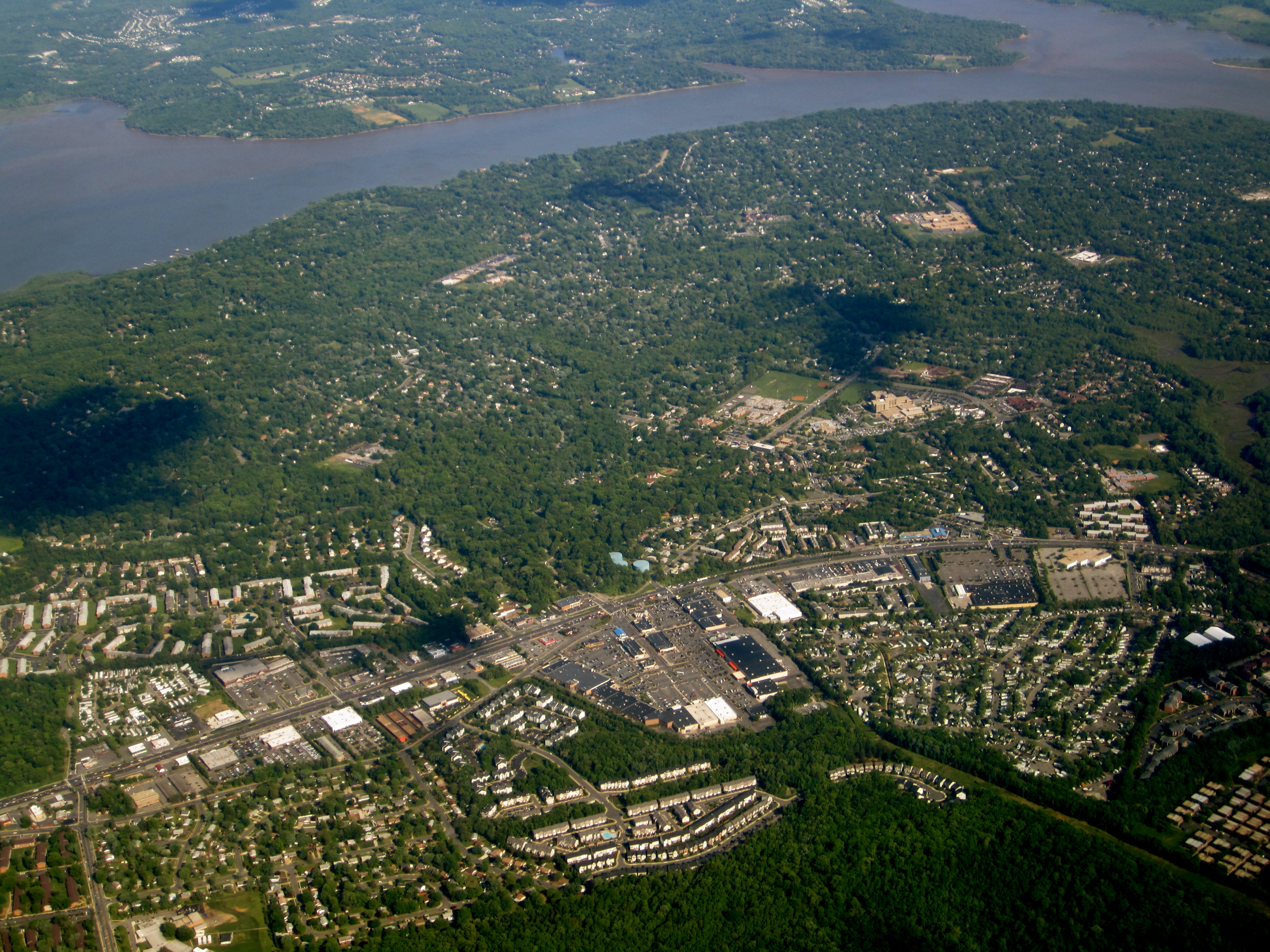
- Aerial view of Hybla Valley

- Location of Hybla Valley in Fairfax County, Virginia

- Location within Northern Virginia Location within Virginia Location within the United States
- Coordinates: 38°44′49″N 77°4′37″W
- Country: United States
- State: Virginia
- County: Fairfax

Area
  - Total: 2.0 sq mi (5.3 km^{2})
  - Land: 2.0 sq mi (5.3 km^{2})
  - Water: 0 sq mi (0.0 km^{2})
- Elevation: 33 ft (10 m)

Population (2020)
  - Total: 16,319
  - Density: 7,949/sq mi (3,069.1/km^{2})
- Time zone: UTC−5 (Eastern (EST))
  - Summer (DST): UTC−4 (EDT)
- FIPS code: 51-39304
- GNIS feature ID: 1495737

Hybla Valley (/haɪblə/) is a census-designated place (CDP) in Fairfax County, Virginia, United States, south of Alexandria. The population was 15,801 at the 2010 census, down from 16,721 in 2000 due to a reduction in area, resulting from some of the eastward neighborhoods including much of Hollin Hills being moved to the Fort Hunt CDP. The population increased to 16,319 in the 2020 census.

== History ==
The Mason family's Hollin Hall plantation, just south of Alexandria, had become the property of several owners, including Edward Curtis Gibbs and the Wilson family. Thomson Dairy had been founded on the land in the late 19th century, and lasted until Merle Thorpe purchased it in the early 20th century. The various dairy farms, such as Sherwood Farm, Hybla Valley Farm, and Popkins Farm were converted into suburban neighborhoods, while plans for the construction of the George Washington Air Junction and the Hybla Valley Airport began. The civilian airport was proposed to be the largest in the world, yet the land, which had once been dairy farm, was abandoned and is currently Huntley Meadows Park. During World War II, the famous Hollin Hills subdivision, to the east of U.S. Route 1 towards the Potomac River, was completed by designers Charles Goodman and Robert Davenport. Also during the war, the princess of Norway sought refuge from the conflict in Europe and wished to purchase the property of Hollin Hall; President Roosevelt personally inspected the land for her, yet his assistant, Thorpe, became its new owner in the end. The land surrounding it became a turkey farm, and was eventually bought by the Mount Vernon Unitarian Church. In 1978, the Mount Vernon Unitarian Church donated land within Hollin Hills to create the wealthy Mason Hill subdivision. The west side of Hybla Valley has developed over the years, including construction of Mount Vernon Plaza in 2002.

In 1833, Gum Springs was founded by West Ford, a freed slave, skilled carpenter, and manager on George Washington's plantation, Mount Vernon. Ford was able to develop this 214-acre farming community in Fairfax County from the sale of land he inherited from Hanna Washington, the sister-in-law of George Washington. By 1866, Ford was the second richest free black farmer in Fairfax County, Virginia. Gum Springs Farm became the nucleus of an African-American community throughout the 1800s. Gum Springs was established along what is now Route 1 (Richmond Highway) and in 1991 a historical marker was erected from the Department of Historic Resource (Marker Number E-04).

Since the early 2000s, the Hybla Valley area has experienced a significant growth of its Hispanic population. As of the 2010 census, the Hispanic population exceeded the African American population in Hybla Valley.

== Geography ==
Hybla Valley is located in southeastern Fairfax County at 38°44′49″N 77°04′37″W (38.746864, −77.076964). According to the United States Census Bureau, the CDP has a total area of 2.0 square miles (5.3 km^{2}), all land. It is bordered by Fort Hunt to the east, Mount Vernon and Woodlawn to the southwest, and Groveton to the west and north. Huntley Meadows Park is to the west within the Groveton CDP, and Little Hunting Creek separates Hybla Valley from Mount Vernon and Woodlawn.

It is characterized by rolling hills, parks, forest, and streams. Paul Springs Valley Stream Park winds past the eastern edge of the community.

== Demographics ==
Historical population
Census	Pop.	Note	%±
1980	15,533		—
1990	15,491		−0.3%
2000	16,721		7.9%
2010	15,801		−5.5%
2020	16,319		3.3%

=== Racial and ethnic composition ===
Hybla Valley CDP, Virginia – Racial and ethnic composition Note: the US Census treats Hispanic/Latino as an ethnic category. This table excludes Latinos from the racial categories and assigns them to a separate category. Hispanics/Latinos may be of any race.
Race / Ethnicity (NH = Non-Hispanic)	Pop 2000	Pop 2010	Pop 2020	% 2000	% 2010	% 2020
White alone (NH)	6,985	4,048	3,406	41.77%	25.62%	20.87%
Black or African American alone (NH)	4,675	4,924	4,599	27.96%	31.16%	28.18%
Native American or Alaska Native alone (NH)	48	45	19	0.29%	0.28%	0.12%
Asian alone (NH)	1,335	1,403	1,521	7.98%	8.88%	9.32%
Native Hawaiian or Pacific Islander alone (NH)	9	16	13	0.05%	0.10%	0.08%
Other race alone (NH)	33	44	75	0.20%	0.28%	0.46%
Mixed race or Multiracial (NH)	423	399	578	2.53%	2.53%	3.54%
Hispanic or Latino (any race)	3,213	4,922	6,108	19.22%	31.15%	37.43%
Total	16,721	15,801	16,319	100.00%	100.00%	100.00%

=== 2020 census ===
As of the 2020 census, Hybla Valley had a population of 16,319, with a population density of 7,948.9 people per square mile. The median age was 34.4 years. 28.2% of residents were under the age of 18 and 11.6% of residents were 65 years of age or older. For every 100 females there were 88.4 males, and for every 100 females age 18 and over there were 83.7 males age 18 and over.

100.0% of residents lived in urban areas, while 0.0% lived in rural areas.

There were 5,657 households in Hybla Valley, and the average household size was 3.24 persons. Of households, 40.2% had children under the age of 18 living in them. Of all households, 39.9% were married-couple households, 18.5% were households with a male householder and no spouse or partner present, and 36.1% were households with a female householder and no spouse or partner present. About 27.2% of all households were made up of individuals, and 8.9% had someone living alone who was 65 years of age or older.

There were 5,966 housing units, of which 5.2% were vacant. The homeowner vacancy rate was 1.2% and the rental vacancy rate was 4.8%.

=== Demographic estimates ===
According to the 2020 American Community Survey, 9.4% of the population was under the age of 5, and female persons totaled 50.8% of the population.

=== Income and poverty ===
The median income for a household in the CDP in 2020 dollars between 2016 and 2020 was $56,188 and the per capita income in the past 12 months over the same time period was $27,054.

According to U.S. News, Hybla Valley has a high cost of living and an elevated price of homes in regards to the rest of the nation. Relative to the rest of the United States, crime in Hybla Valley is categorized as low, and the median income is categorized as average.

== Education ==
Fairfax County Public Schools operates public schools.

Fairfax County Public Library operates the Sherwood Regional Library in the CDP.
