= Huntley Meadows Park =

Park in Fairfax County, Virginia

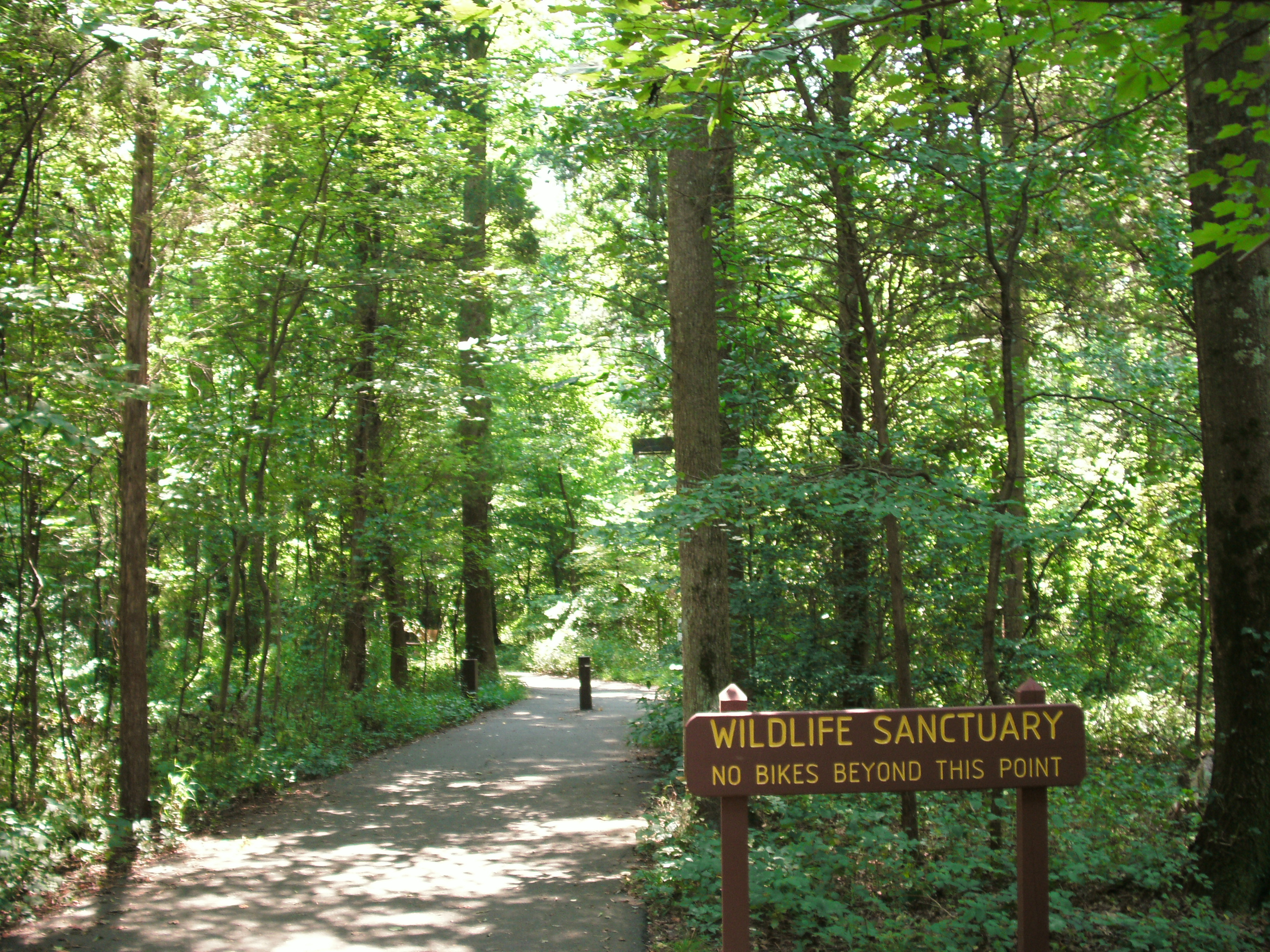
- Interactive map of Huntley Meadows Park
- Location: Hybla Valley, Fairfax County, Virginia, USA
- Coordinates: 38°45′37″N 77°05′44″W
- Area: 1,452 acres (588 ha)
- Created: 1975
- Operator: Fairfax County Park Authority
- Status: Open all year
- Website: Official site

Huntley Meadows Park, the largest park operated by the Fairfax County Park Authority (1,452 acres or 588 hectares), is located in the Hybla Valley area of Fairfax County, Virginia, south of the city of Alexandria. The park features a visitor center, a beaver-created wetland with boardwalk, wildlife observation platforms, and an interpretative trail system. The park is home to abundant wildlife and is known for attracting many birds, amphibians, and plants that are considered less common in the region. Secondary-growth forest, sprinkled with several small, native-grass and wildflower meadows surround much of the wetland habitat. The main bodies of water that flow through the park are Dogue Creek at the western border of the park; Barnyard Run, the source of the park's Central Wetland; and the headwaters of Little Hunting Creek.

== History ==
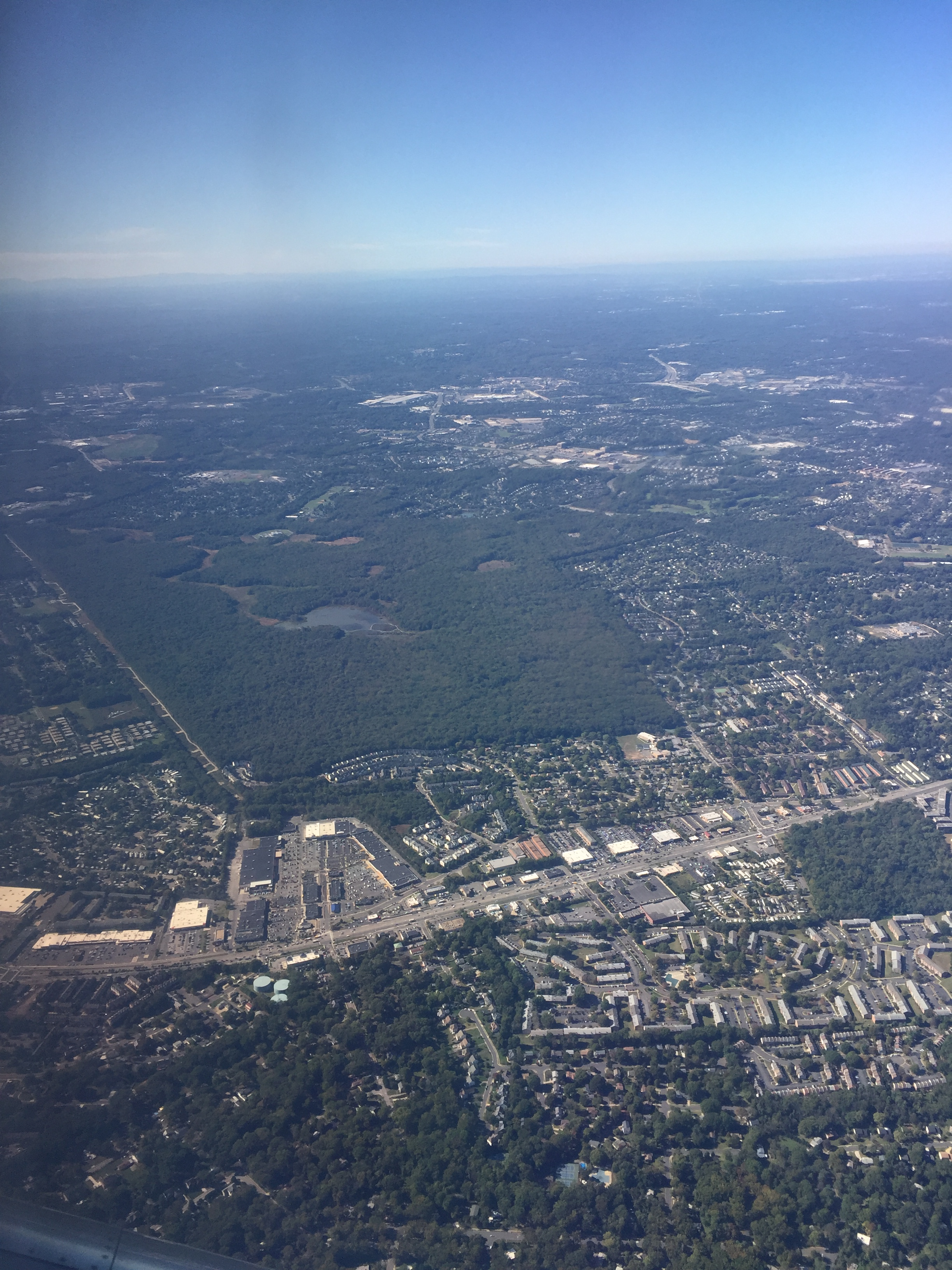
Huntley Meadows Park from the air in 2017

In 1757 the land was purchased by George Mason. About 1825 his grandson built Huntley, on a hill overlooking the property. Huntley is now listed on the National Register of Historic Places. Another grandson held Okeley Manor which is now the northwest portion of the park. In the late 19th and early 20th centuries, the area was used for dairy farming.

In colonial times, this land was part of the extensive property holdings of George Mason IV. Thomson Francis Mason, a grandson of George Mason, built a summer residence on the property in 1825. The house, now known as Historic Huntley, is listed on the National Register of Historic Places, the Virginia Landmarks Register, and the Fairfax County Inventory of Historic Sites.

Mason family ownership lasted into the early 1900s, with sections of the land being sold for family farms. In the late 1920s, entrepreneur Henry Woodhouse reassembled the parcels, purchasing 1,500 acres (610 ha) from 10 landowners. He dreamed of transforming Hybla Valley's dairy farms into the George Washington Air Junction, which he claimed would be the largest airport in the world. After he lost nearly all of the property, the federal government acquired the land.

The land was bought by the federal government in 1941. From 1943 to 1953, the Bureau of Public Roads tested asphalt road surfaces. The Virginia National Guard's Battery D, 125th Gun Battalion provided anti-aircraft protection for the nation's capital from 1950 to 1959. And the Navy conducted highly classified radio communication research from 1958 to 1971, before declaring the land surplus around 1971.

In 1975, President Gerald Ford signed papers authorizing the donation of 1,261 acres (510 ha) to the citizens of Fairfax County, "exclusively for public park or public recreation purposes in perpetuity." Under the Federal Legacy of Parks Program, the County paid only one dollar for the land. In 1992 the Fairfax County Park Authority, with financial assistance from Ducks Unlimited, purchased an additional 165 acres (67 ha) of adjacent wetland and upland.

== Huntley Meadows today ==
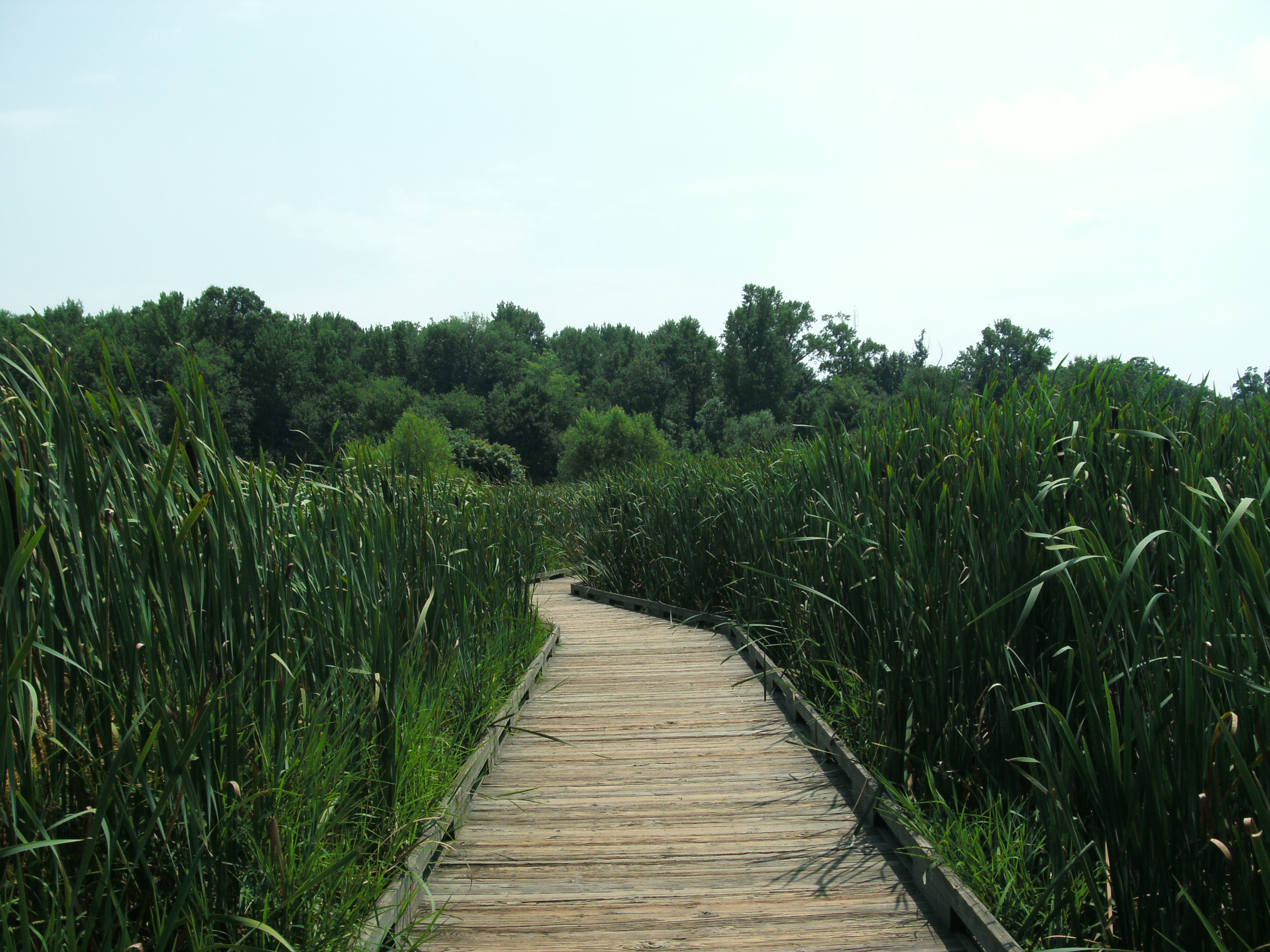
Boardwalk and wetlands at the park

After the federal government turned the land over to Fairfax County in 1975, beavers quickly returned to the area and began to change how water flowed through the land. Biodiversity in what is now referred to as the Central Wetland rapidly increased and a boardwalk was opened in 1982 to allow visitors the opportunity to closely observe the largest habitat of its kind in the region. Over 200,000 people now visit the park every year, seeking wildlife observation, exercise, and relaxation. The staffed visitor center offers many exhibits on the park's human and natural history as well as educational programs for all ages.

A nonprofit organization, Friends of Huntley Meadows Park, provides significant support to the park. In addition to its dedication to the protection of park resources, the organization also helps provides funding for programs, internships, and equipment.

=== Wetland restoration ===
A wetland restoration project for the Central Wetland has been in the design phase for several years. The restoration is meant to manage and preserve the wetland structure and biodiversity through various natural resource challenges. Major components include: a small concrete dam, access road, shallow wetland pools, dead tree placement within the wetland, and expansion of nearby park meadows with soil excavated from the project. Nearly three million dollars from voter approved bonds will be spent by the County on these improvements.

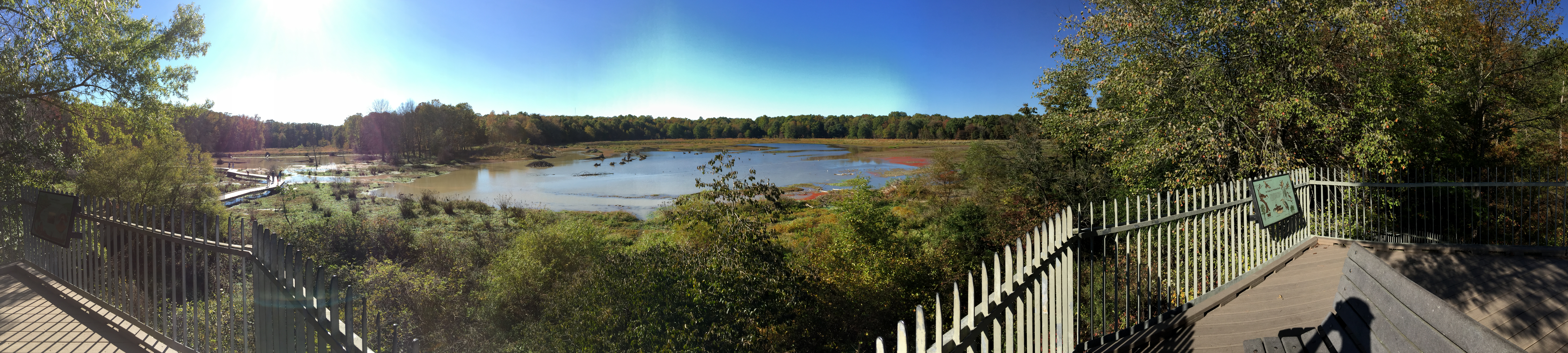
The beaver lake at Huntley Meadows

== Activities ==
Huntley Meadows Park has over 3.8 miles (6.1 km) of maintained trails. Near the wetland areas these trails are over boardwalks (no pets permitted on boardwalk). There are many watch areas and benches along the maintained Heron, Deer and Cedar trails.

Bird and wildlife watching is the main activity. There are multiple observation towers and stations along the trails. The park is well known in the region for nature photography by professionals and hobbyists. Photos taken at the park have won awards including the grand prize for the 2019 Audubon Photography Awards and judges choice for the North American Nature Photography Association Showcase 2020. The public Facebook group Huntley Meadows Park Photography has over 6,400 members as of January 2022.

Various naturalist talks, school education programs, self-guided tours and even artistic performances are offered at the park.

== Geology ==
About 100,000 years ago the land was on a western meander of the Potomac River. About 30,000 years ago the river straightened to its present course leaving an oxbow lake. The lake filled in creating Huntley Meadows and Hybla Valley.

== Flora and fauna ==
Many plant and flower species are in Huntley Meadows; over 600 species have been identified, including 300 species of wildflowers. There are over 200 species of birds, 30 of mammals, 50 of reptiles and amphibians, 50 of dragonflies and damselflies.

Like many parks, Huntley Meadows is dealing with non-native invasive plant species. Japanese stiltgrass is a continuing concern as it grows well and covers the forest floor. The park has undertaken initiatives, such as boot cleaning sites at trailheads to limit seeds being spread, to attempt to combat it.
