= Hollin Hall (Virginia) =

House in Virginia, United States

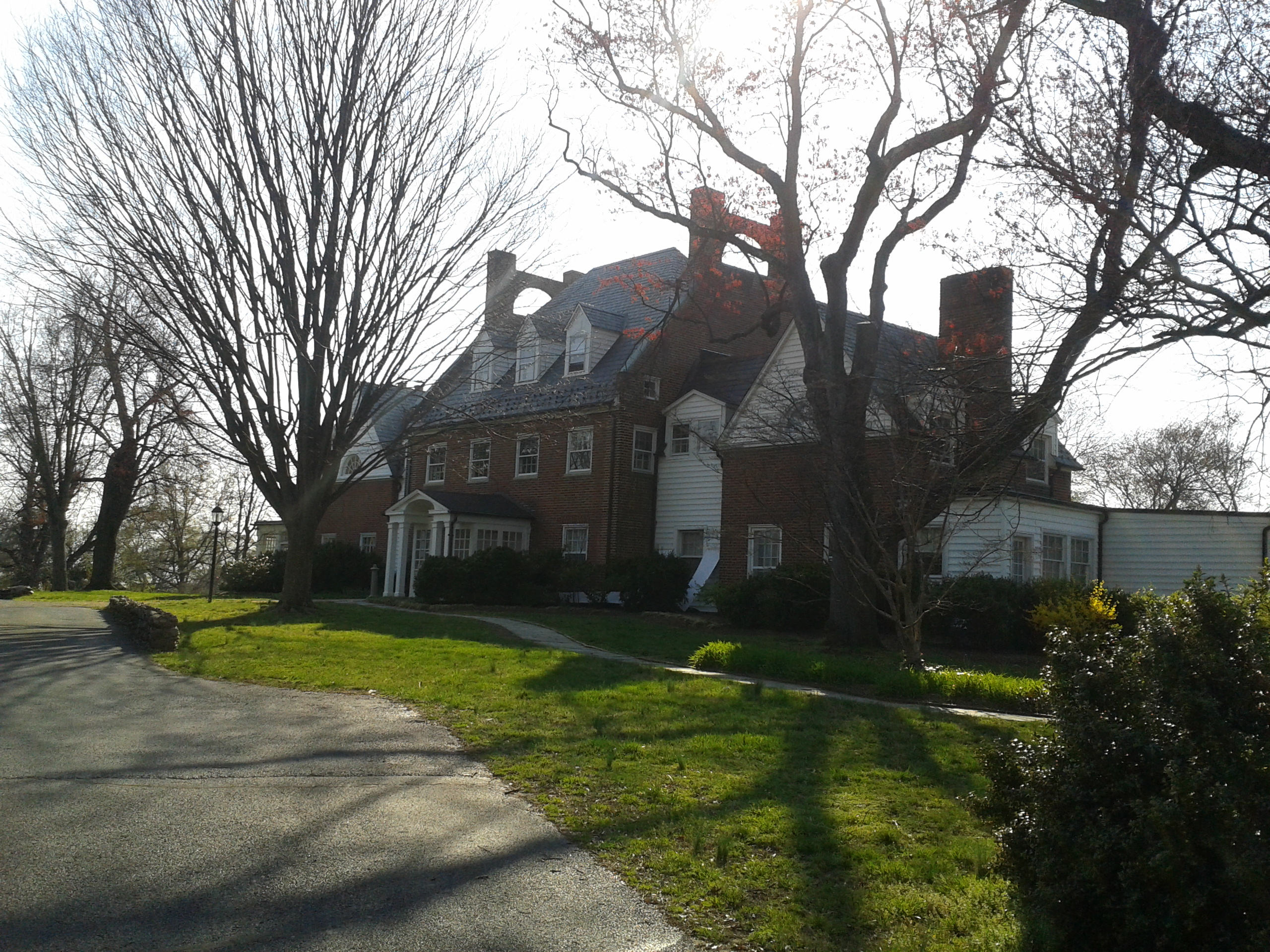
- The current house at Hollin Hall, today owned by Mount Vernon Unitarian Church.

General information
- Location: 1909 Windmill Ln, Alexandria, VA 22307, Hollindale, Virginia, Hybla Valley, Virginia (CDP)
- Coordinates: 38°45′13″N 77°03′56″W

Hollin Hall was an 18th-century plantation house three miles (5 km) southwest of Alexandria in Fairfax County, Virginia. George Mason, a United States Founding Father, gave Hollin Hall to his third son, Thomson Mason, through deeds of gift in 1781 and 1786. The land, as given, totalled 676 acres (2.74 km^{2}). Thomson Mason was the first member of the Mason family to actually live here. Before then, tenants farmed the property.

George Mason also helped Thomson Mason have a house constructed. Thomson and his wife, Sarah McCarty Chichester, celebrated Christmas, 1788 in the new house. However, as late as 1792 George Mason wrote Thomson about difficulties procuring lumber for the Hollin Hall front porch. Fire destroyed the house in 1824, four years after Thomson's death.

An outbuilding survived and became known as Little Hollin Hall. In 1852, Thompson's son George Mason of "Spring Bank" sold the property to Quakers Edward and Eliza Gibbs, and in 1868 Mason wrote to congratulate them on their success in growing wheat, which inspired his own son to try the crop despite financial difficulties after the war. Hollin Hall continued occupied well into the 20th century. In 1916, industrialist Harley Wilson and his wife bought the property and constructed a new residence, pool and other buildings. It was advertised for sale again in 1938.

The Hollin Hills (whose name was inspired by the estate) neighborhood, primary to the west and north of Hollin Hall, was developed in the 1940s and is now a historic district of mid-century modern homes and landscape design.

Mount Vernon Unitarian Church bought the property from Mrs. Merle Thorpe in 1958. It hosted a Congress on Racial Equality (CORE) training workshop in 1961, as well as other civil rights activities, both local and national, during the next several years. The congregation also worked against the Vietnam War and for affordable housing. In 1983, the church sold part of the property to finance construction of a new meeting house to replace the old car garage.

Fairfax County added the building to The Fairfax County Inventory of Historic Sites in 1993. In 1994, with the help of Alexandria's Campagna Center, the main hall was restored as a decorator showcase, and started hosting concerts several years later. Further renovations (e.g. kitchen and air-conditioning) were performed in 2003–2004. It is currently available for function rental such as weddings.
