= Kathleen Mary Spagnolo =

American artist

- Born: Kathleen Mary Trigg; September 12, 1919; London, England
- Died: February 15, 2016 (aged 96); Alexandria, Virginia
- Resting place: Culpeper, Virginia
- Education: Royal Scholar at the Royal College of Art in London; American University
- Alma mater: Royal College of Art
- Known for: Aquatint, Printmaking, Illustration
- Spouse: Frank Spagnolo (1913–1972)

Kathleen Mary Spagnolo (September 12, 1919 – February 15, 2016) was an American artist based in Alexandria, Virginia.

After graduating as a Royal Scholar from the Royal College of Art in London, she worked as an artist for the Royal Air Force during World War II. There she met her American husband and emigrated to America. Spagnolo worked as a commercial illustrator in Alexandria before studying printmaking at American University under Robert Franklin Gates and Krishna Reddy.

Her work is included in the collections of the Smithsonian American Art Museum, the University of Arizona Museum of Art the Georgetown University Art Museum.

Spagnolo was an original homeowner of the Hollin Hills Historic District, a nationally recognized mid-century modern community in northern Virginia. For more than 30 years, she was active in the community and helped produce the Hollin Hills Bulletin newsletter. She died in 2016 and is buried at the Culpeper National Cemetery with her late husband and Army veteran Frank Spagnolo (1913–1972).
