= Joan Darrah =

American activist for LGBTQ rights

Joan Darrah is an activist for LGBTQ rights, specifically the end of the "don't ask don't tell" (DADT) policy, which prohibited gay, lesbian, and bisexual service members from being open about their sexual orientation.

Darrah joined the Navy in 1972, unaware that she was a lesbian, and retired in June 2002 as a captain. At one point in her career, she supervised 1500 people at Naval Intelligence Command, including openly gay civilians. Darrah was a Navy officer who narrowly escaped being killed in the September 11 attacks on the Pentagon, which caused her to reevaluate the harm the policy was causing to her life. Due to this, she retired in 2002 after serving for thirty years.

In pursuit of ending DADT, in 2006 she founded and chaired a Mount Vernon Unitarian Church (MVUC) Task Force, and in 2007, she and several other MVUC members collected signatures and successfully advocated for a Unitarian Universalist Association (UUA) Action of Immediate Witness (AIW) to repeal DADT.

She testified at a House Armed Services Committee hearing in July 2008 to advocate the repeal of DADT. She said she would not join the Navy as a lesbian with DADT in place, now that she understood how stressful it would prove. She cited the inability of a homosexual servicemember to seek redress for harassment. In response to another witness who said "unit cohesion is a leadership issue", she said:

I was somewhat offended by the comments about military leadership. I mean, the military and I, as a leader and part of the military, pride ourselves on our ability to be good leaders and to take diverse groups of people, different colors, different genders, different religions, and figure out how to work together to accomplish the mission. And that was one of the most wonderful things in my experience in the military. I had never met a black person when I joined the military. By the time I left, I didn't care anything about a person—their religion, their ethnic, their skin color. All I cared about was their performance and their ability to get the job done.

She did media interviews, such as PBS's Diane Rehm Show and C-SPAN's Washington Journal, ABC's Good Morning America, NBC Nightly News and Barry Lynn's Culture Shocks. She lobbied Congress and was a leader in the Servicemembers Legal Defense Network. She wrote an open letter to the President advocating for the repeal of DADT, which was published on the Service Members Legal Defense Network website. She also wrote an opinion piece for CNN in 2010 titled "My secret life under 'don't ask, don't tell'" in which she detailed the hardships the policy had caused her as a gay woman.

Darrah is the partner of Lynne Kennedy, an openly gay reference librarian at the Library of Congress. They married on December 17, 2010, after twenty years together, one day before the Senate voted to repeal DADT. At the invitation of the White House, she attended the ceremony at which President Obama signed the Don't Ask, Don't Tell Repeal Act of 2010. In 2012, Darrah wrote an opinion article for CNN titled "Respect Sally Ride's decision not to come out."
