= Mount Vernon Unitarian Church =

Church in Virginia, US

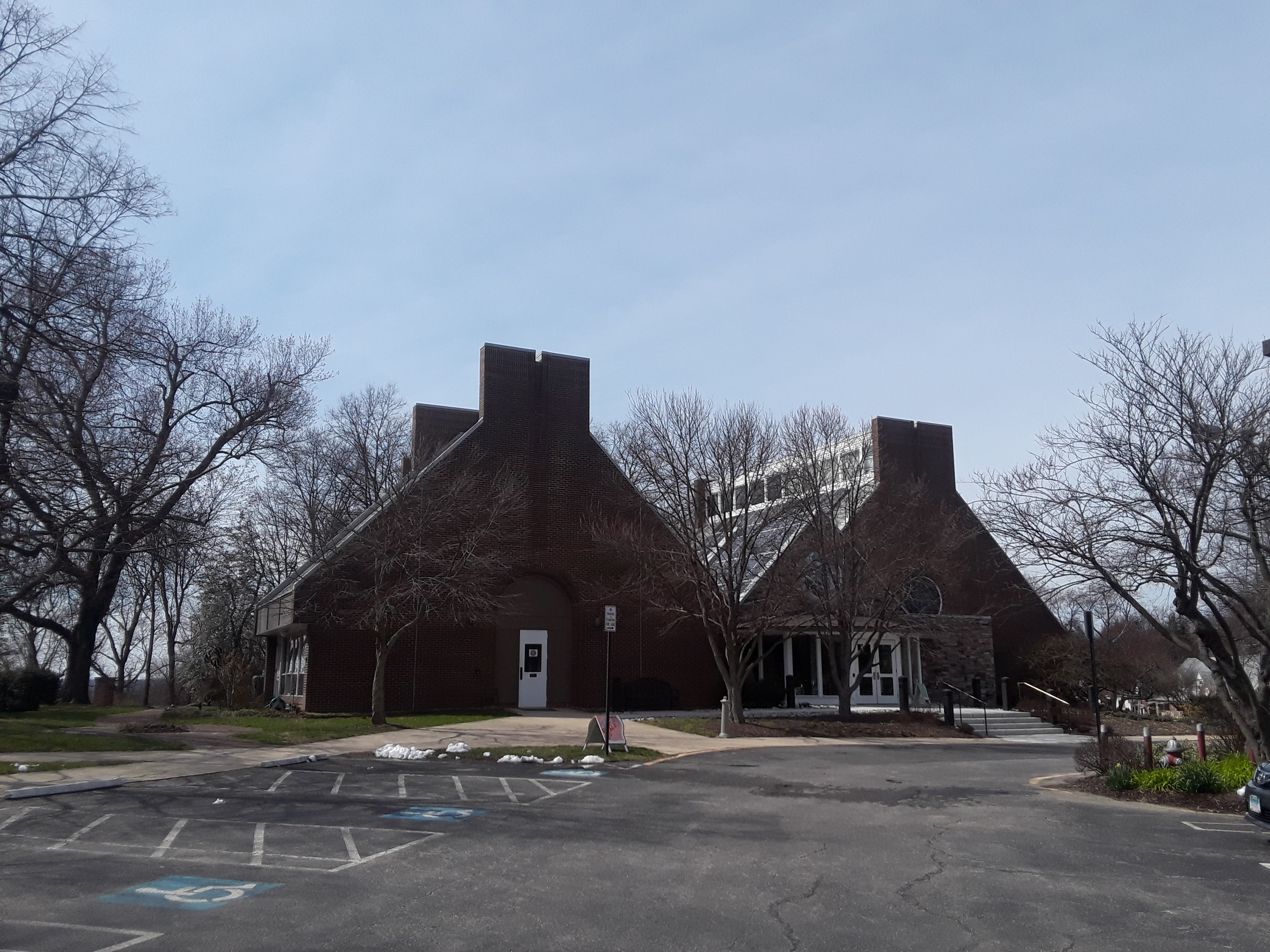
- Mount Vernon Unitarian Church
- 38°45′14″N 77°03′57″W
- Location: 1909 Windmill Ln, Alexandria, VA 22307
- Country: United States
- Denomination: Unitarian Universalist (UUA)
- Website: mvuc.org

History
- Founded: 1955

Mount Vernon Unitarian Church (MVUC) is a Unitarian Universalist church in the Fort Hunt area of Fairfax County, Virginia and a member of the Unitarian Universalist Association (UUA). It meets on a portion of the historic Hollin Hall estate. It is a long-time "welcoming congregation," which means it is open and affirming to all. The church has a long history of supporting LGBTQ rights and is an active social justice congregation.

== History ==
Founded in 1955, MVUC is one of the five congregations originally founded in the 1950s as groups who listened to the services of Rev. A. Powell Davies from All Souls Church, Unitarian (Washington, D.C.) by telephone until they were able to call their own ministers. Beginning in 1955, they met at Hollin Hall Elementary School and then the congregation then bought the 10 acre Hollin Hall property in 1958. The church used the existing guest house as their meeting house until 1985 when a newly constructed sanctuary on the church grounds opened.

In 1961, the church housed members of the Congress of Racial Equality (CORE) to train students as freedom riders in the South and the board of trustees was threatened with legal action by Fairfax County. The CORE national office had asked the church to host the CORE's training on the grounds since ideally located in a place that was both "'liberal' enough to permit interracial" living and "a site that has real problems which can be tackled". The board voted unanimously in support of the three-week training. The Fairfax County Zoning administrator ordered the training shutdown, including threatening to arrest CORE's leaders. The board refused and, after news stories, the grounds were vandalized with "tacks across the wooded driveway" to the church.

In 1963, during the March on Washington for Jobs and Freedom, John M. Wells, MVUC's minister at the time, lead the UU group of approximately 1,600 people, including the UUA president Dana McLean Greeley.

Every November for the past 55 years (through 2017), the church hosts an annual holiday bazaar called the "Holiday Shop," which features dozens of artisans, crafters, and local sellers. The Every Thursday Group quilts and auctions off a new quilt each year, as well as preparing food to sell.

Members of the church, including Joan Darrah, led a successful drive in 2007 to have the UUA issue an Action of Immediate Witness to repeal the United States Policy of "Don't ask, don't tell."

== Grounds ==
The grounds currently include the meeting house (expanded in 2010s), Hollin Hall itself, a greenhouse, a restored windmill, Carriage House, historic turkey sheds, three-tiered boxwood gardens, formal garden, memorial walks, and open spaces and trees. Several other buildings were part of the church's purchase of its portion of the state, but they've been sold or demolished. The windmill, which long been a part of the identity of the church, was partly dismantled in 1962 but a campaign in the 1990s led to it being restored in 2000. Long-time caretaker John Stevens, who began in 1926, stayed on when the church bought the property until his retirement in the 1993 and continued to love and maintain the grounds; both Stevens and a minister at the time, Rev. David E. Bumbaugh, spoke out in defense of an old tree just off the property in 1978.

In 2007, the church and its property made the local news when The Washington Post featured a story of how a large Paulownia tree was apparently stolen from its grounds, probably on the belief it would be valuable.

The church is near Hollin Hills, a mid-century modern architecture historic district, and the church's grounds were part of the inspiration for the production designers of Mad Men (Dan Bishop) and Sex and the City (Jeremy Conway), where they played sports on the grounds and Conway attended the Shakespeare productions hosted by the church on their grounds.

== Fort Hunt Preschool ==
Fort Hunt Preschool (originally named Fort Hunt Co-Operative Preschool) began as part of the church in 1962 by a group of parents as a cooperative preschool and continues to lease the Carriage House building since becoming its own organization in 2003.

== See also ==
- All Souls Church, Unitarian (Washington, D.C.)
- Unitarian Universalist Church of Arlington
