= Little Hunting Creek =

Coordinates: 38.71294°N 77.07412°W

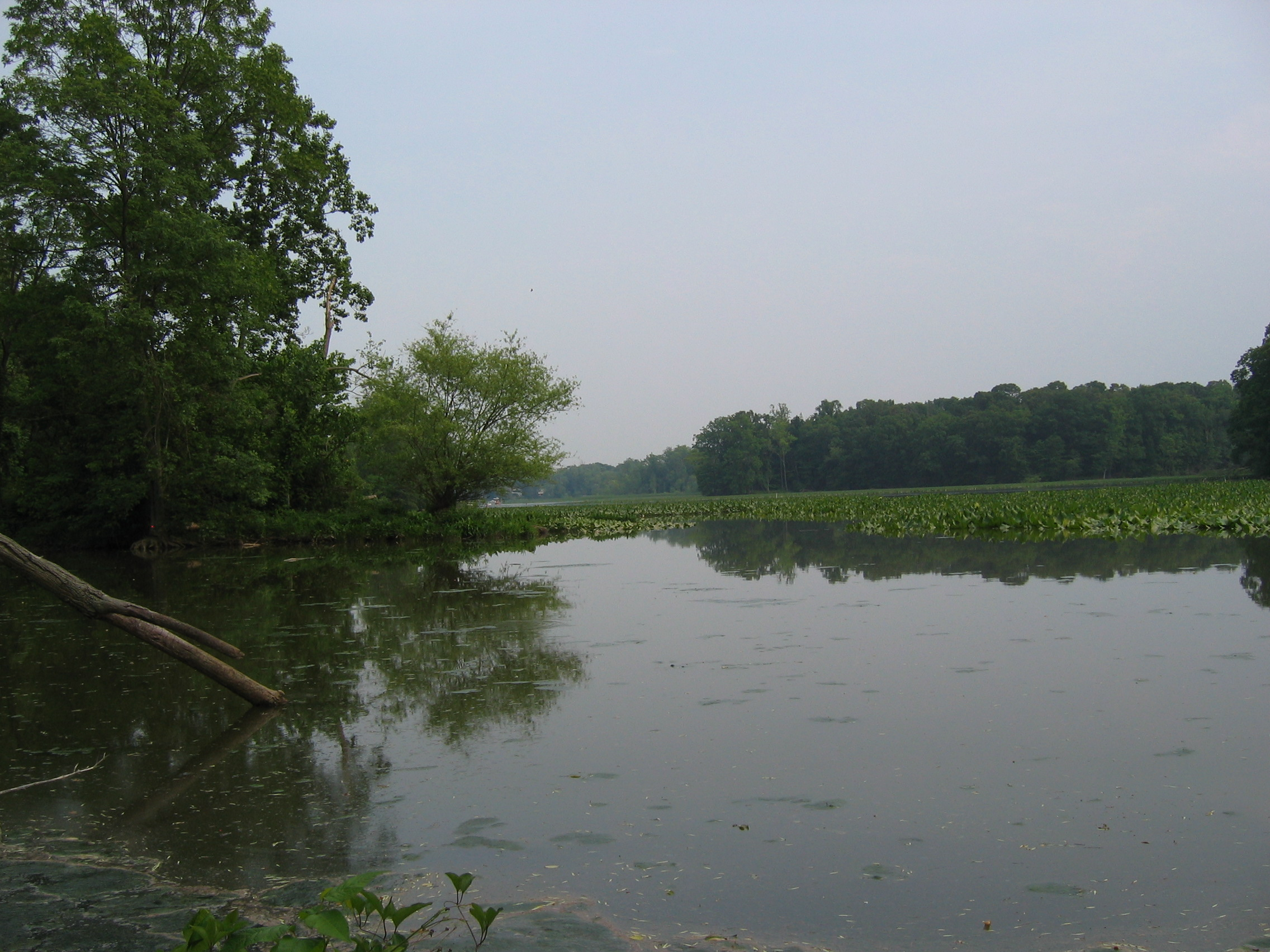
- Little Hunting Creek, viewed from its east bank looking south

Location
- Country: United States
- State: Virginia
- County: Fairfax County

Physical characteristics
- Mouth
  - location: Potomac River
  - elevation: 0 feet (0 m)
- Length: 3.6 mi (5.8 km)

Little Hunting Creek is a 3.6-mile-long (5.8 km) primarily tidal tributary of the Potomac River located in Fairfax County, Virginia, not to be confused with Hunting Creek farther north. A stone-arch bridge, completed in 1931, carries traffic on the George Washington Memorial Parkway across the narrow mouth of the creek, located 96.6 miles (155.5 km) upriver from the mouth of the Potomac. The Washington family built its Mount Vernon plantation on the Potomac River along both banks of Little Hunting Creek during colonial times. The creek is bordered by residential communities in addition to the Mount Vernon property. It is a popular location for recreational fishing, and much of the wildlife characteristic of the tidal Potomac wetlands can be spotted there.

== History ==
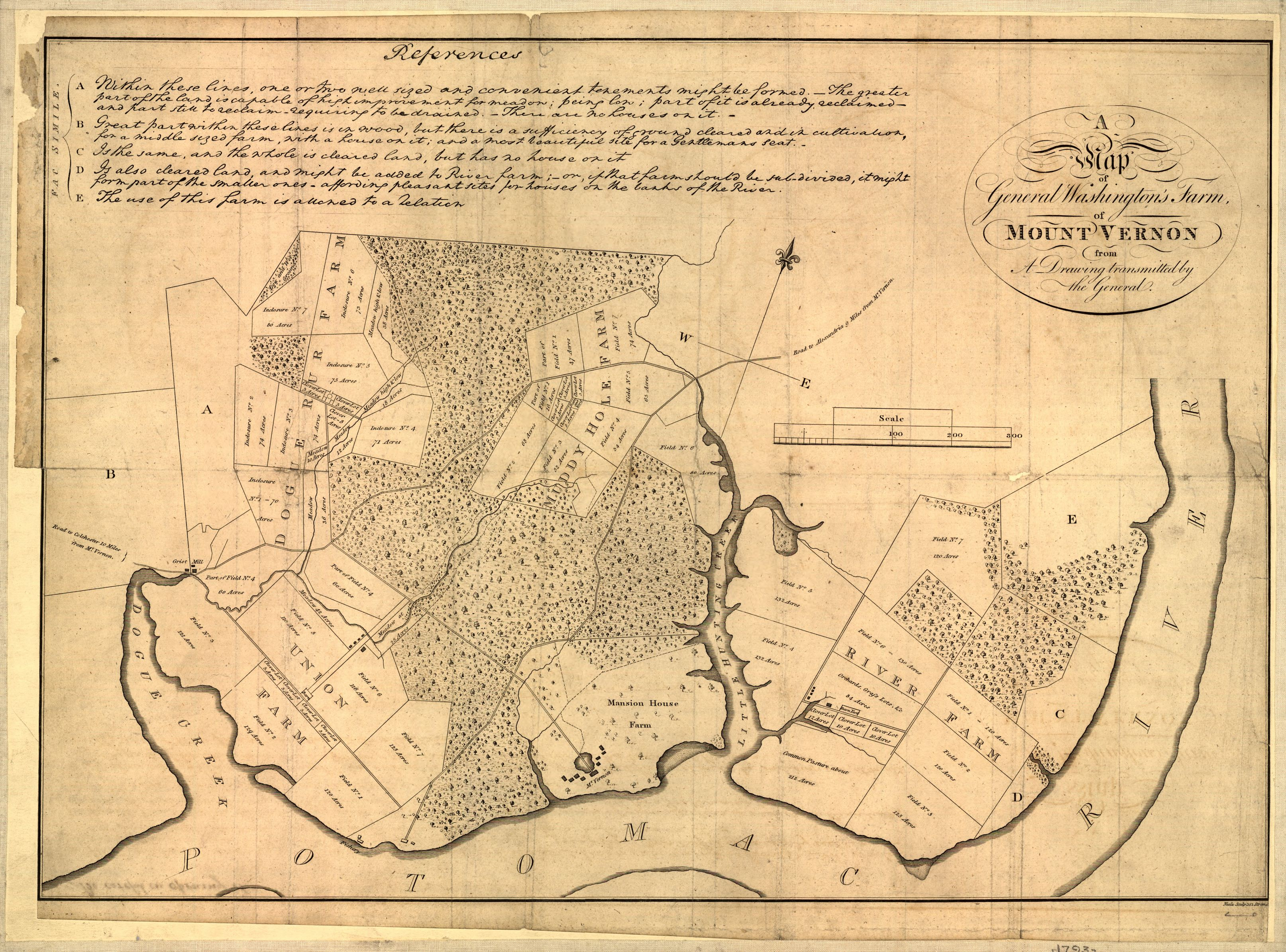
Colonial-era map of George Washington's estates surrounding Little Hunting Creek, including the Mount Vernon manor. The South Branch and part of the North Branch of the creek are visible.

At the time of John Smith's explorations of Virginia in the early 17th century, Little Hunting Creek was the site of a settlement of Indians from the Doeg (Dogue) tribe. By the latter part of that century, the land by Little Hunting Creek had come into the hands of John Washington, great-grandfather of George Washington. What was originally known as Little Hunting Creek Plantation eventually became known as George Washington's Mount Vernon estate. The creek separated the Mansion House Farm to the west from the River Farm to the east.

In 1765, when Fairfax Parish was carved out of the existing Truro Parish, Little Hunting Creek marked the southeastern end of the dividing line.

In 1929, a bridge was designed as a part of the Mount Vernon Memorial Highway, and completed in 1931. The bridge was not part of the original plans for the highway – other creeks were successfully filled in with soil to cut costs; but the Little Hunting could not be filled in, because the soil in the creek bed was very unstable.

By the 1960s residential communities began to spring up on both sides of the creek. The remnants of a sewage treatment plant are situated on the eastern shore of the creek downstream of the North Branch fork.

== Watershed ==
The headwaters of Little Hunting Creek begin in Huntley Meadows Park on the west side of U.S. Route 1, about 3 miles (4.8 km) northwest of the Potomac River entrance to the creek. The creek is fed by three major tributaries. The South Branch (known during colonial times as Carney's Gut, after the tenant there) is located in the southeast portion of what is now the Stratford Landing neighborhood. It empties into the east side of the creek a few hundred yards northeast of the Potomac River entrance, and bifurcates southeast of Fort Hunt Elementary School into a fork heading north and a fork heading east toward Fort Hunt Park. The North Branch breaks off from the main creek in a northeasterly direction about 1.5 statute miles (2.4 km) up from the Potomac River entrance, near the northwestern end of Stratford Landing. The Paul Spring Branch breaks off about another 1.5 statute miles (2.4 km) up the North Branch in the Hollin Hall area near Sherwood Hall Lane, and continues northward along Fort Hunt Road into the Hollin Hills community and beyond.

== Wildlife ==
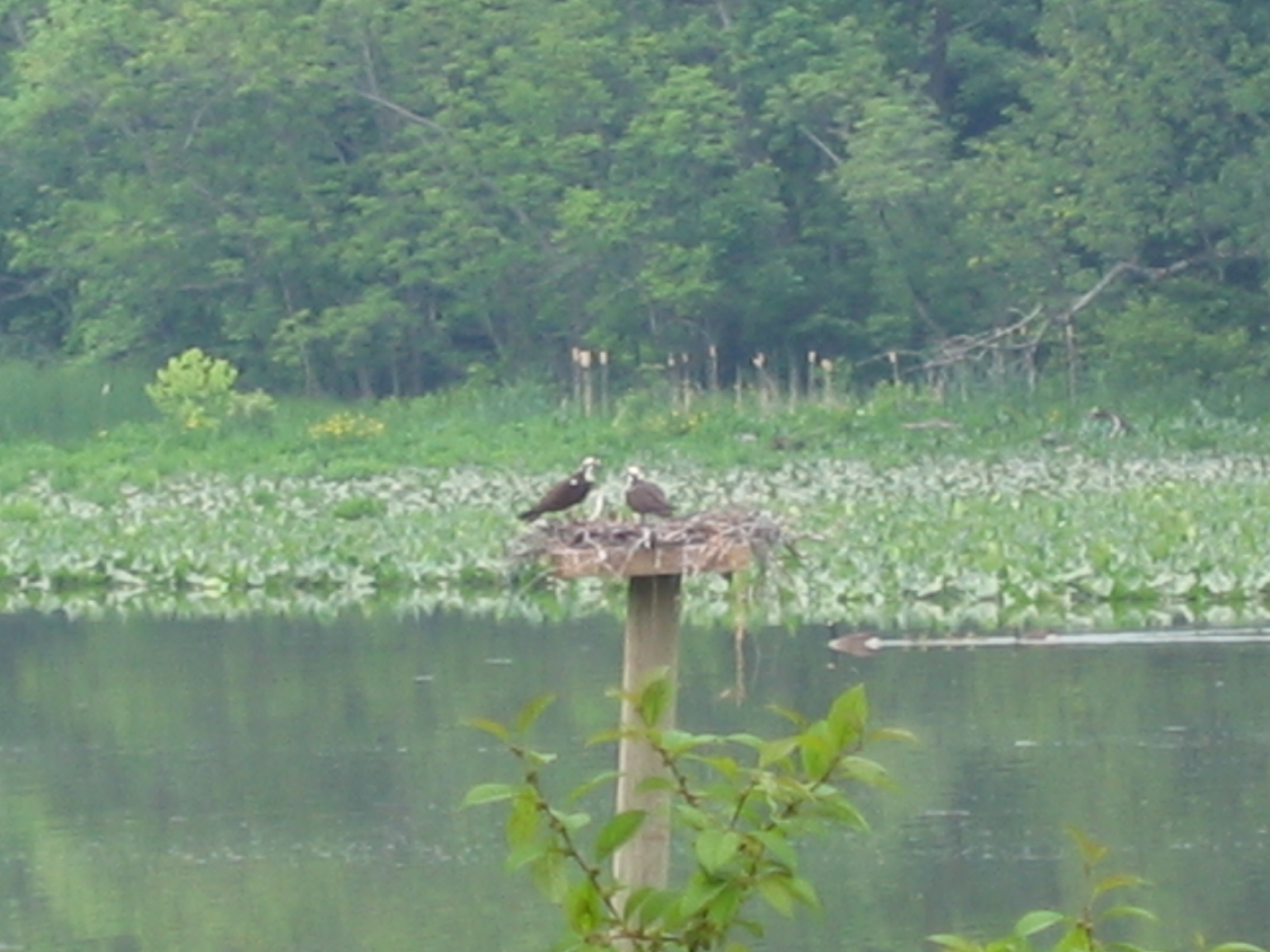
Ospreys and Canada geese on Little Hunting Creek

Little Hunting Creek is home to wildlife. Migratory birds such as mallards, Canada geese, great blue herons, and great egrets are common sights along the creek. Ospreys nest there, usually on top of a post in the creek. Bald eagles have been spotted in the area. Muskrats and the occasional beaver have been seen in Little Hunting Creek, and groundhogs and foxes can be found in the woods near the water. Fish such as catfish, carp, perch, and largemouth bass are found in the creek. In 2004, Little Hunting Creek became one of the first places where invasive northern snakehead fish were caught near the Potomac.

== Recreation ==
Little Hunting Creek remains navigable by canoe or kayak upstream to the North Branch fork or farther, depending on the tides. Both sides of the navigable creek border residential communities, and many homeowners maintain private boat docks for launching canoes, sailboats and other vessels into the creek and from there to the Potomac River. Nesting ospreys can often be observed from a road in the Stratford Landing neighborhood, Thomas J. Stockton Parkway, that runs alongside the creek. The creek is an excellent place for largemouth bass fishing.

In 2004, a debate arose about whether the installation of duck blinds and duck hunting should be permitted on the creek.

Swimming is not advised, particularly in light of drownings that have occurred in the vicinity of the stone-arch bridge.

== See also ==
- List of rivers of Virginia
