= Hollin Hills =

Historic place in Virginia, United States

- Hollin Hills Historic District
- U.S. National Register of Historic Places
- Virginia Landmarks Register
- Fairfax County Historic Overlay District
- Fairfax County Inventory of Historic Sites
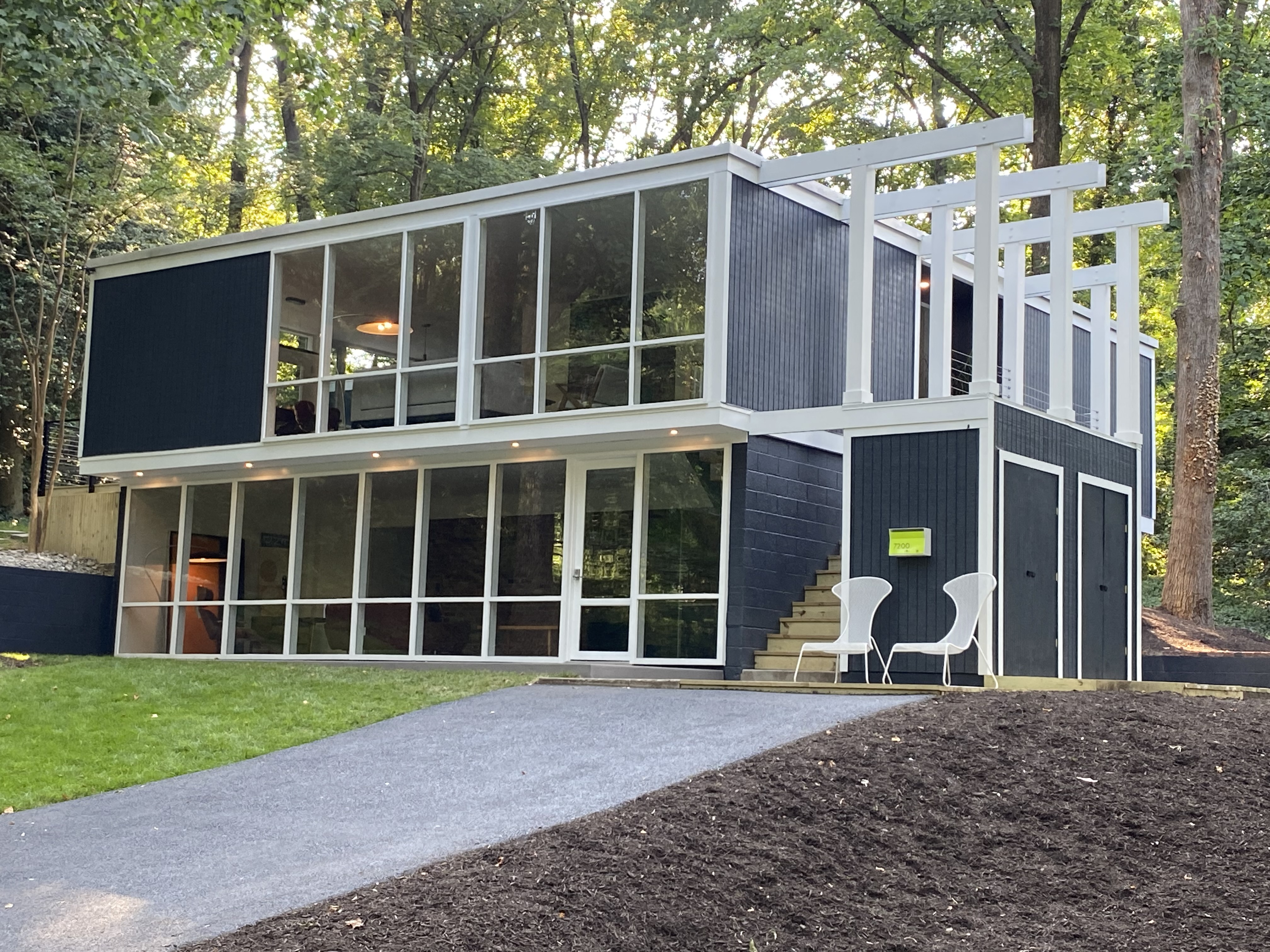
- Example of Unit Type No. 5B home constructed in 1954 designed by architect Charles M. Goodman in Hollin Hills neighborhood

- Location within Northern Virginia Location within Virginia Location within the United States
- Location: Fort Hunt area of Fairfax County, roughly Beechwood, Elba, Glasgow, Martha's, Paul Springs, Range & Stafford Rds., Mason Hill, Rebecca & Whiteoaks Drs., Alexandria, Virginia
- Coordinates: 38°45′23″N 77°04′02″W
- Area: 326 acres (132 ha)
- Built: 1946 (land acquired); 1949–1971 (home builds)
- Built by: Davenport, Robert C.
- Architects: Goodman, Charles M.
- Architectural style: Modern Movement
- Website: www.hollinhills.org
- MPS: Historic Residential Suburbs of the United States, 1830–1960
- NRHP reference No.: 13000807
- VLR No.: 029-5471

Significant dates
- Added to NRHP: September 30, 2013
- Designated VLR: June 19, 2013
- Designated FCHOD: March 8, 2022
- Designated FCIHS: September 12, 1972

Hollin Hills is a historic district and neighborhood approximately 10 miles south of Alexandria, Virginia. Though mailing addresses in Hollin Hills are listed as being in Alexandria, it is actually in an unincorporated part of southeastern Fairfax County. It is located primarily in the Fort Hunt area of the county with some portions remaining in the Hybla Valley and Groveton areas since a shift for census purposes prior to 2010. The community contains more than 30 acres (12 ha) of parkland across seven distinct parks, a pool and swim club, a bocce court, and a pickleball and tennis club, operated and maintained by the Civic Association of Hollin Hills (CAHH).

Principally designed by Charles M. Goodman and developed by Robert C. Davenport in the 1940s, it was one of the Washington, D.C. area's first post-war modernist architecture developments, combined with natural landscape designs between 1949 and 1971. Davenport purchased the original 225 acres (91 ha) of hilly, undeveloped land for $550/acre (present value:$9,081/acre). As home sales and national acclaim grew, he then acquired another 101 acres (41 ha) in 1956, and constructed more homes until the "New Hollin Hills" was completed in 1971. In all, roughly 450 houses with contemporary construction techniques and landscape plans were established in northern Virginia, offsetting the area's more common Colonial Revival homes. Today, the neighborhood is known primarily for its mid-century modern architecture homes, each is uniquely oriented on its lot to maximize its privacy and landscape view, with sight lines intentionally chosen to enhance the common space shared by each structure. These design tenets have remained very cohesive because of a long-standing design review committee that advises on building or modification of existing houses, and starting in 2022, its designation as the Hollin Hills Historic Overlay District (HOD), which requires modifications and additions to be reviewed by Fairfax County Architectural Review Board.

The Hollin Hills Historic District is a 326 acres (132 ha) residential neighborhood encompassing 468 contributing buildings, five contributing sites, and three contributing structures for its 2013 designation in the Virginia Landmarks Register and the National Register of Historic Places. The boundaries of Hollin Hills reflect the initial purchase of the 225 acres in 1946 as the site for a residential suburb and the neighborhood's 1956 expansion by Robert Davenport that added 101 acres to the southwest of the original section. The historic district encompasses all of the present 326 acres (132 ha) of Hollin Hills, composed of single-family dwellings, parks, and recreational areas.

Residents have Alexandria mailing addresses with ZIP codes 22306 or 22307.

== History ==
=== Early history ===
Thomas Fairfax, 6th Lord Fairfax of Cameron appointed land agents who lived on the Northern Neck to sell parcels from what became known as the Fairfax Grant. The land agents for the proprietor included Philip Ludwell, George Brent, and William Fitzhugh. They processed the paperwork for Northern Neck grants (i.e., land sales) rather than the Secretary and Governor in Jamestown/Williamsburg. Based on pre-1742 maps of the Patents and Northern Neck Grants of Fairfax County, the land of present-day Hollin Hills sat on land once owned by land agent, George Brent.

Based on an 1862 Union engineer map (VREF 975.52 U 1862 DC.), known as the “McDowell map”, Hollin Hills sat near Sparrow Hill, which later formed Popkins Farm.

=== 1949 to present ===
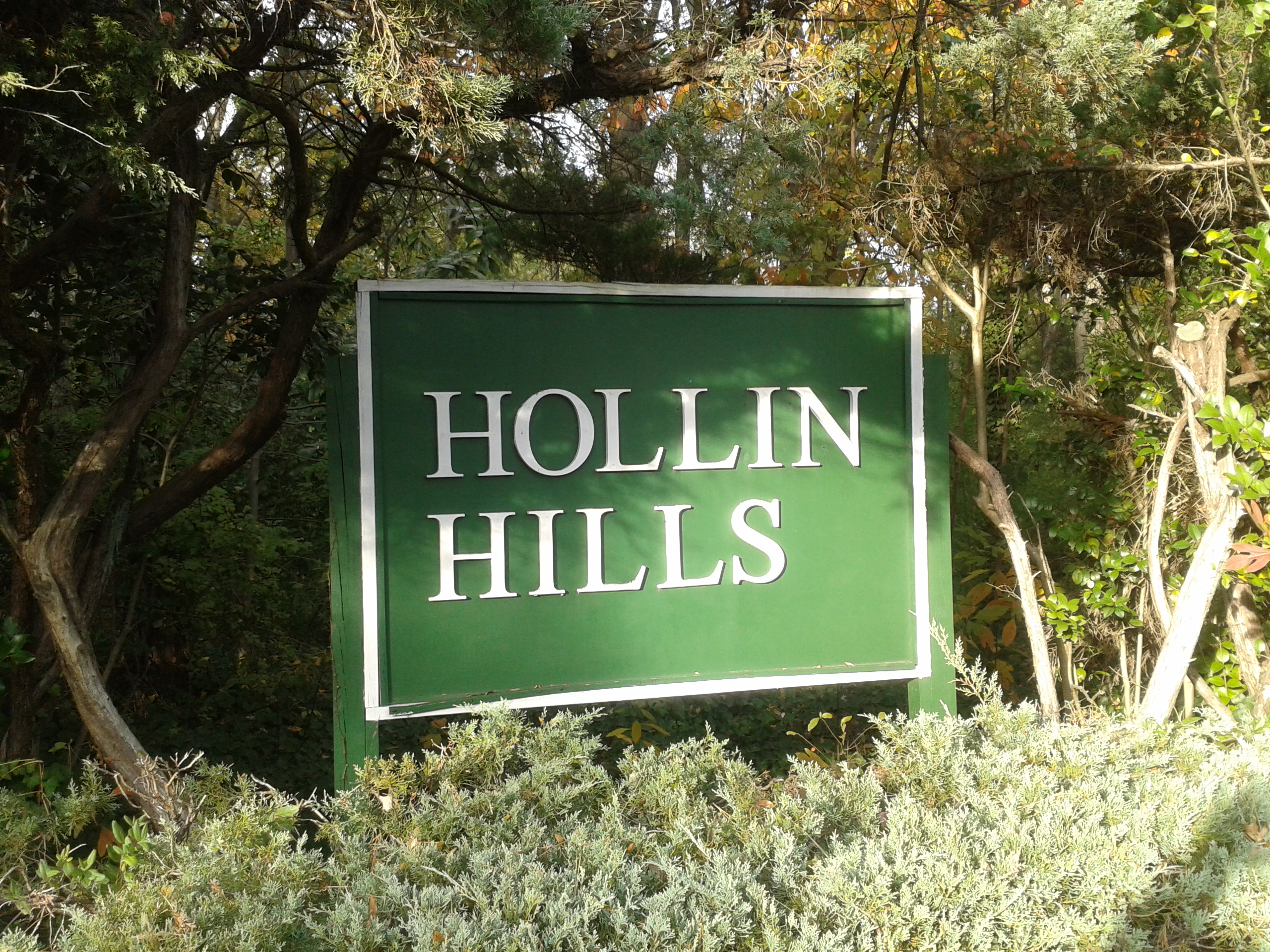
Neighborhood entrance sign on Sherwood Hall Lane

"The land subdivision in general has been designed to bring out the best qualities of each individual site, rather than to obtain the maximum number of lots per acre. Hollin Hills is a community of homes which have been fitted to the land."

— Architect's Statement - Charles M. Goodman

When Davenport acquired the original tract, he intended the name "Hollin Hills" as a variation of the 18th-century Hollin Hall Plantation, originally owned by George Mason, one of the Founding Fathers of the United States, known as the "Father of the Bill of Rights." General Mason named his lands after an English estate of his mother's family. Some of the Hollin Hall plantation buildings still stand on Sherwood Hall Lane.

== Modernist architecture ==
Davenport hired D.C.-based architect Charles M. Goodman (who also designed the Washington National Airport) to design the community; Goodman hired landscape architect Lou "Barney" Voigt to his firm in 1950. Together, the trio of builder/developer, architect and landscape architect chose to design each home with lots no smaller than one-third of an acre. Between 1949 and 1961, Charles Goodman designed eight modern unit types with variations in square footage and interior amenities, comprising 15 different combinations for Hollin Hills. During construction, many trees were retained to block sight lines, and houses were built at angles to ensure privacy. The popularity of the homes, which feature huge expanses of glass, established Goodman as a nationally acclaimed guru of modern architecture. Davenport named some streets to complement the community name, while others were named after family members: Martha's Road for his mother and Rebecca Drive for his daughter. Elba Road was named after one of his prize bulls.

Throughout the community, several custom designs, additions and modifications were constructed beyond the unit types creating an “architectural laboratory” for modern home design. In 1957, Goodman was appointed to design Alcoa Care-free Homes across the United States using more than 7,500 pounds (3,400 kg) of aluminum per home. Only 23 were ever built, including one in Hollin Hills, which has since been restored. This Elba Road-home is one of the district's NRHP contributing properties and is listed separately within the Virginia Department of Historic Resources’ ‘’Notable Modern Architecture in Virginia, ca. 1940-1990’’ listing.

== Environment ==
In 1950, Goodman employed Harvard-trained landscape designer Lou "Barney" Voight to develop landscape plans for homes that optimized their home-sitting, the rolling hills and natural wood setting. After his untimely death at age 37 in 1953, he was followed by Daniel Urban Kiley and Eric Paepcke who focused on more geometric designs. Each provided property owners with landscaping plans intended to harmonize the contours of the land and highlight each building's individual design and siting. Depending on the address and date of construction, residents of today may obtain copies of their original landscape plans from the Library of Congress, Harvard's Frances Loeb Library, or George Mason University's Fenwick Library.

Stormwater throughout Hollin Hills is part of the Little Hunting Creek watershed that flows to the Potomac River and onto the Chesapeake Bay. Starting in April 2021 after months of debate, Fairfax County closed access to the parks and began stream restoration projects designed to restore and stabilize the dangerously eroded perennial streambeds in Goodman and Brickelmaier Parks and restore the parks to safety, ecological health, and natural beauty, which was heavily debated by residents, ecological experts and the county. The two parks were reopened in November 2022.

== Infrastructure ==
=== Transportation ===
Motor vehicles are the most common form of transportation to and from Hollin Hills via its 11 ingress/egress points. Most houses do not feature garages, and instead include carports that may have been part of Goodman's plans or added via additions by Goodman associate Eason Cross Jr., and other architects throughout the years. Many homes in the original 225-acre tract have gravel parking pads at the edge of the street, in addition to driveways. County restrictions prohibit the parking of watercraft, motor homes, campers, trailers, and other large vehicles on public streets, as the community is within the Mount Vernon Community Parking District.

Virtually all public roads (interstate, primary and secondary) in Fairfax County are maintained by the Virginia Department of Transportation (VDOT). The county's public bus service, Fairfax Connector, has nearby connections via Route 101 (Fort Hunt–Mt. Vernon) and Route 152 (Groveton–Fort Hunt) routes, located near the intersection of Fort Hunt Rd and Paul Spring Rd, near the Hollin Hills Pool and community entrance. The Huntington station serves as the nearest rapid transit terminal of the Washington Metro (WMATA) system. Ronald Reagan Washington National Airport (DCA), located approximately 8 miles north, is the closest airport for residents.

=== Utilities ===
Trash and recycling collection throughout Fairfax County is performed either by the county or private collection company. The entirety of Hollin Hills is located within the County Collection service area.

Dominion Energy is the primary supplier of electricity to area residents. Homes with natural gas are supplied Washington Gas. The Fairfax County Water Authority (or simply, Fairfax Water) is the primary water company for potable water supply to homes and fire hydrants.

Regulated wireline telephone service (aka, land line), digital/cable TV service, and residential Internet service is available with Comcast, Cox and Verizon.

== Government ==
For elections, the majority of Hollin Hills is located within the Kirkside (608) voting precinct and the Hollin Meadows Elementary School is the polling place. For others, residents are served by the Bucknell (604) voting precinct and its Bryant Center polling place.

- In the U.S. House of Representatives, residents are represented by Virginia's 8th congressional district.
- For representation in the Virginia General Assembly, the community rests inside Virginia's 44th House of Delegates district and Virginia's 36th Senate district, for State Delegate and State Senator, respectively.
- At the county (or district) level, citizens are served by the Mount Vernon Magisterial District of Fairfax County for representation amongst the Fairfax County Board of Supervisors, and other district representatives on a variety of boards and commissions within the county.
  - Mount Vernon Station No. 9, located in Sherwood Hall Lane, is the nearest response unit for emergency services from the Fairfax County Fire and Rescue Department (FCFRD).
  - Of the eight police stations of the Fairfax County Police Department (FCPD), Mount Vernon District Police Station is nearest the community.
- At the community level, the Civic Association of Hollin Hills (CAHH) is a member association of the Mount Vernon Council of Citizens’ Associations, which was formed to represent and promote the interests of its member associations and to further the common good and general welfare of the residents of the Mount Vernon Magisterial District.

== Education ==
Within the community's first five years, construction began on Hollin Hills Elementary School, located adjacent to the community entrance along Fort Hunt Road, immediately north of the intersection with Paul Spring Road. The school was built at a cost of $275,964 (present value: $3.32 million) and opened its doors to students from Hollin Hills and other neighborhoods on September 6, 1955. In 1956, after some delay, Groveton High School opened. In 1960, William C. Bryant Intermediate School opened, one of the county's first racially integrated schools, taking grades from local elementary schools and Groveton High School. The originally all-white Hollin Hills Elementary School was desegregated in 1964. In 1965, Hollin Meadows Elementary School was built on Nordock Place, directly adjoining the neighborhood near its southern end.

By the late 1970s, enrollment numbers from other neighborhoods to the north and the older northern part of Hollin Hills had declined, leading to the closure of Hollin Hills Elementary School in June 1980. (Its buildings have since been converted into the Paul Spring Retirement Community living center.) In 1985, the Bryant Intermediate School was closed, and Hollin Hills's children were shifted to the new Carl Sandburg Intermediate School, which also included students from the closing Stephen Foster Intermediate School. This new larger intermediate school took over the building of Fort Hunt High School. At the same time, Groveton High School was expanded to cover the neighborhoods that had previously gone to nearby Fort Hunt High School, into which Foster Intermediate School's student had formerly matriculated. Groveton was renamed to West Potomac High School. Each of these changes prompted objections from resident within Hollin Hills and other neighborhoods, not the least because of rivalry between the high schools and perceptions of class differences between them. As Hollin Hills was one of the higher incomes neighborhood within the Bryant/Groveton district, its children faced particular tensions in the earliest years of the new configurations, though those old lines were quickly forgotten as children aged through the system.

As of 2024, public elementary and secondary education of resident youth is provided by Fairfax County Public Schools (FCPS) with school board representation from the Mount Vernon District. FCPS schools serving the community remain Hollin Meadows Elementary School, Carl Sandburg Middle School and West Potomac High School (Wolverines). There are also many private schools in the area, such as Bishop Ireton High School (Cardinals) and St. Stephen's & St. Agnes School (Saints).

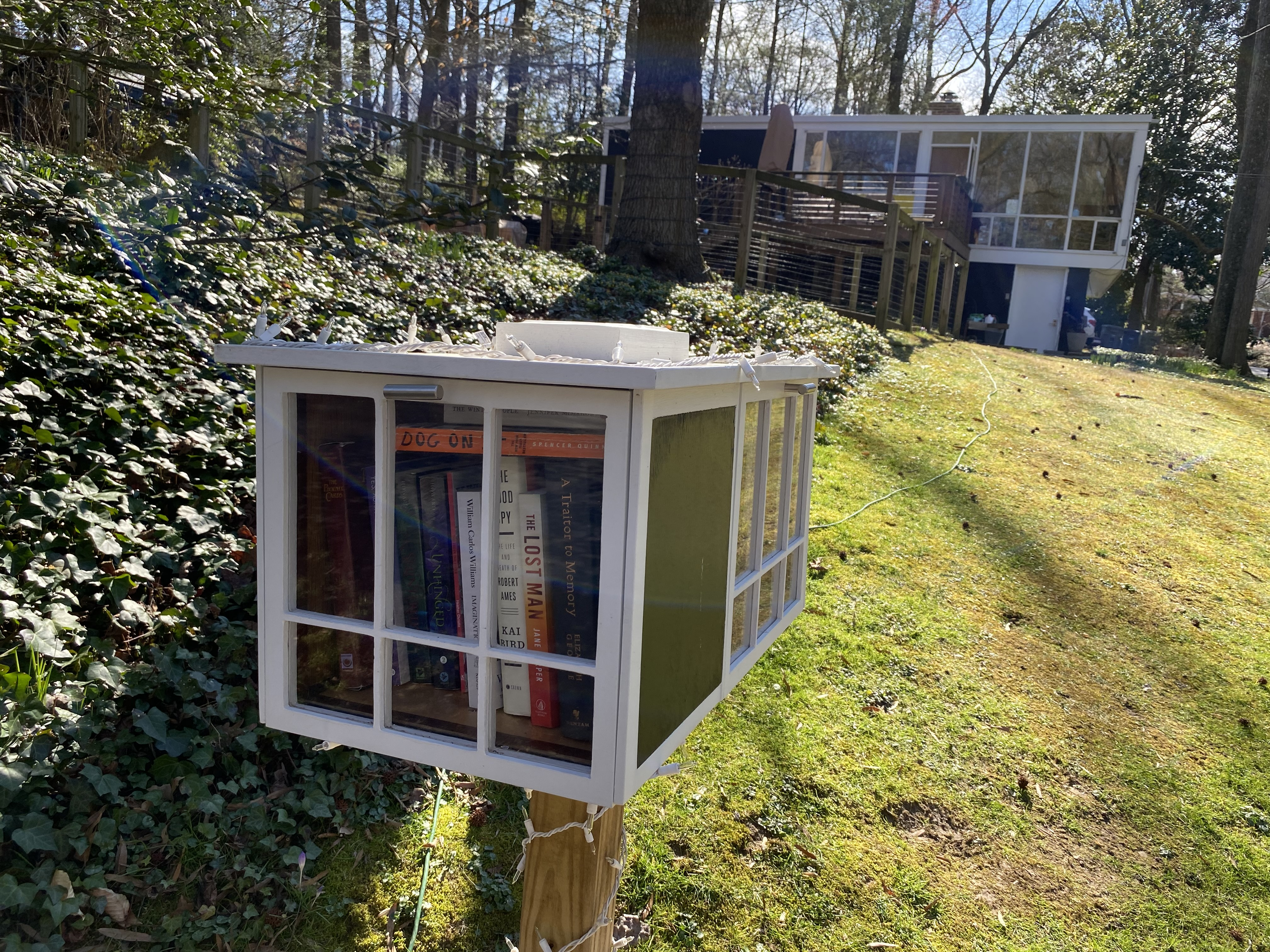
Little Library Book Exchange in Hollin Hills at 2200 block of Glasgow Rd

The nearest public libraries to Hollin Hills are the Sherwood Regional Library (opened in 1971) and Martha Washington Library (opened at its current location in 1961) served by the Fairfax County Public Library (FCPL) system. In addition, several residents have installed and maintain neighborhood book exchanges and chartered Little Free Library locations throughout the neighborhood, often stylized in the shape of mid-century modern homes found throughout the community.

== Civic association ==
The Civic Association of Hollin Hills (CAHH) is a volunteer residential membership organization structured to promote the common good of the community. It is led by a nine-member, democratically elected Board of Directors which manages a variety of community activities, social and educational events, including a monthly newsletter, a resident/owner directory, an architectural design review committee, management and oversight of 30 acres of parkland, the Hollin Hills Pool, Hollin Hills Pickleball and Tennis Club, and the biennial house and garden tour.

=== Parks ===
Resident volunteers with efforts of the CAHH Parks Committee and the Friends of Hollin Hills organize to enhance park amenities and to control non-native, invasive species such as English ivy, multiflora rose, and tea viburnum. The seven CAHH parks include:

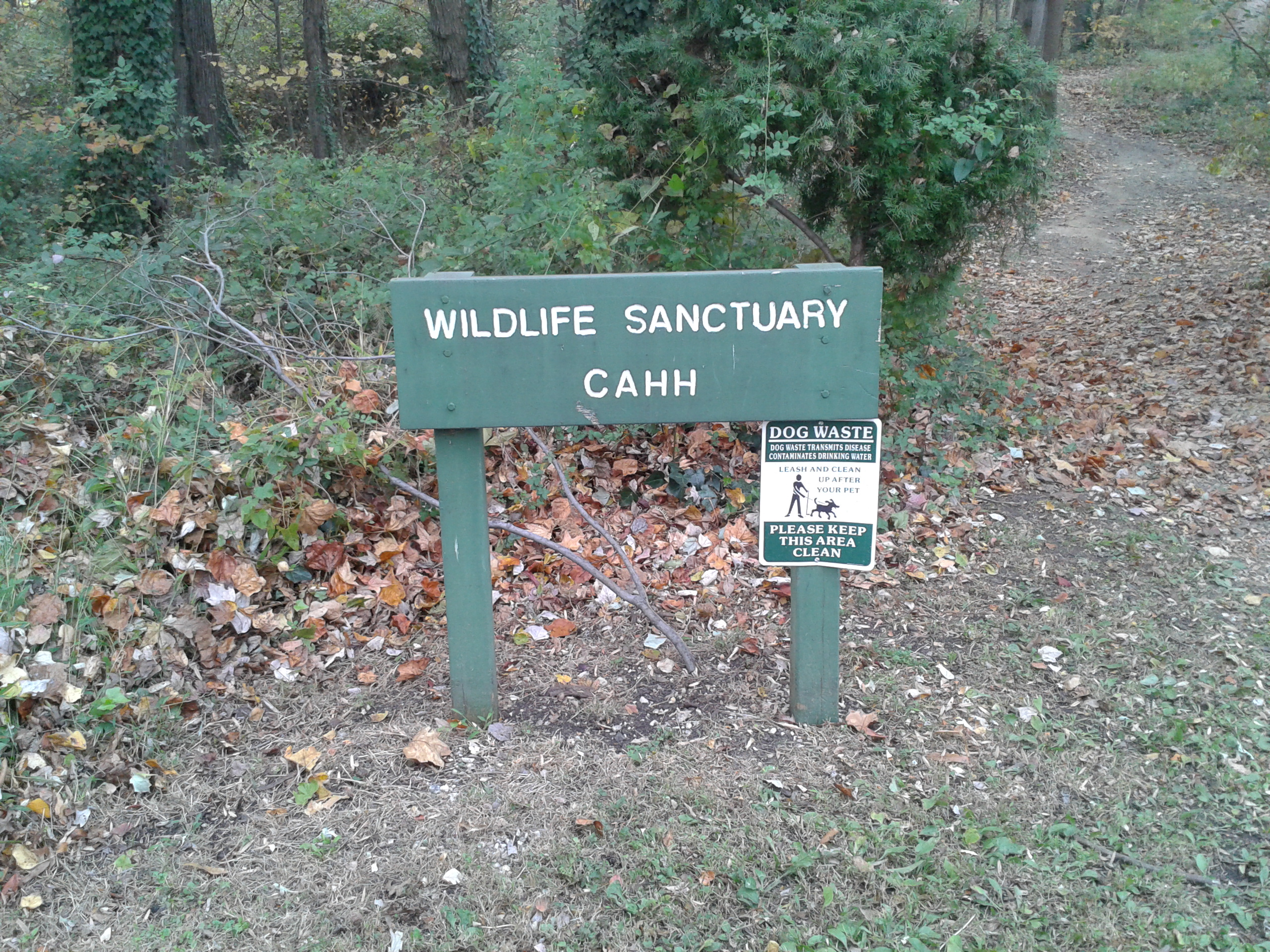
CAHH entrance sign for Wildlife Sanctuary

- Paul Spring Park–a 6.38 acres (2.58 ha) park that runs along the north side of Paul Spring Road, located in the Groveton area. According to the county website, Paul Spring Park is located in a FEMA-designated "100 year floodplain" (aka, Zone AE) and Chesapeake Bay Resource Protection Area (RPA) since 1993.
- Voigt Memorial Park–a set of three properties totaling 9.772 acres (3.955 ha) located between Fort Hunt Road and Rippon Road at the eastern edge of Hollin Hills in the Fort Hunt area, including the Hollin Hills Pool & Swim Club, the Hollin Hills Pickleball & Tennis Courts and wooded parkland. The main portion of the park includes a children's playground, with a bocce court located along Rippon Road. Voigt Park is located within FEMA Zone AE floodplain and the Chesapeake Bay Preservation Area RPA since 1993.
- McCalley Park–a small 0.351 acres (0.142 ha) park named after Charles R. “Mac” McCalley, the construction foreman of Hollin Hills from 1949 to 1971. It is located at the southwest corner of Paul Spring Road and Rippon Road across from Voigt Park. This land was once the site of one of the originally built homes but often suffered from flooding. As a result, the structure (formerly 1801 Paul Spring Rd) was raised and the property purchased by Fairfax County Board of Supervisors in 1990. The entire park is located within the Chesapeake Bay Preservation Area RPA with some portions within a FEMA Zone AE floodplain.
- Charles Goodman Park & Trail–originally named East Stafford Park and renamed after the neighborhood's master architect and planner. The sloping, narrow park consists of two tracts at a combined 3.2029 acres (1.2962 ha) size that directly borders 28 home properties, and is located in the Fort Hunt area and runs roughly north–south from Paul Spring Road to Martha's Road; it can be accessed at either end. A riparian zone exists along its stream. The park is similar to Brickelmaier Park in that it is mostly forested land following the Paul Spring Branch stream with a riparian corridor.
- Brickelmaier Park & Trail–the park originally was known as West Stafford Park, but was renamed in 1978 in honor of George Brickelmaier, an original resident of Hollin Hills who worked with developer Robert Davenport. This Fort Hunt area park is 3.104 acres (1.256 ha) and is accessible from Popkins Lane and Paul Spring Road, and borders 20 properties along Beechwood Road, Stafford Road, Bedford Lane, and Pickwick Lane. The park is mostly forested land that followed the natural watercourse of the Paul Spring Branch stream with a riparian corridor which buffers the stream. The park is within a designated RPA since 2003.
- Wildlife Sanctuary–a relatively level 2.785 acres (1.127 ha) set of six tracts, which was subdivided for development in the 1960s, but never improved. It is located in the Hybla Valley area and Hybla Valley Farm land tract along Delafield Place and Boswell Avenue, west of Elba Road. While it was acquired through a land trade with Fairfax County in 1976, it is a part of the HOD. The majority of the land is located within the Chesapeake Bay RPA since 2003.
- Sutton–Potter Park–a narrow, sloping 5.37 acres (2.17 ha) rectangular park along with a much smaller 0.29 acres (0.12 ha) access tract (aka, the dogleg) at the western edge of Hollin Hills (in the Hybla Valley area). The park entrance is located via path in the 7400 block of Range Road. The homes along this block (officially designated in county records as Hollin Meadows) are a semi-exclave to Hollin Hills; its homeowners and residents are allowed to join and become members of the CAHH. This park was acquired in 1966 as part of a land swap with the county; it is located outside the historic district and HOD.

Lastly, other nearby parks inclusive of the county HOD but located outside of the state and national historic district boundaries are White Oaks Park and two portions of the Paul Springs Valley Stream Park, all of which is maintained by the Fairfax County Park Authority (FCPA).

=== Swim and racquet clubs ===
Goodman and Davenport originally planned and submitted to Fairfax County for zoning approval in 1952 that Hollin Hills would have its own shopping center and gas station; however, the county rejected the plan and the shopping center is never built on the corner of Paul Spring Road and Fort Hunt Road. The site is now the home of the Hollin Hills pool, and tennis and pickleball courts. Completed in 1954, Hollin Hills Pool & Swim Club, which was established on 2.95 acres (1.19 ha) of land purchased by the Civic Association from Robert Davenport. The Hollin Hills Swim Team, established in 1956, is one of the nine charter members of the Northern Virginia Swim League (NVSL). The Hollin Hills Bluefish compete in NVSL Division 14.

In 1955, the community formed a tennis club and four tennis courts were built and remained in use for many years until the 1990s when period flooding from the Paul Spring Branch damaged the courts to become nearly unplayable. In 2021, the community voted to replace half the tennis courts. In 2022, six pickleball courts were built atop two of the tennis courts; the courts are managed by the CAHH Hollin Hills Pickleball and Tennis Club. The pool/tennis/pickleball property, now consisting of 6.137 acres (2.484 ha), is located along Fort Hunt Road at its intersection with Paul Spring Road. Both the swim and racquet clubs offer resident and non-resident membership options.

In 1964, the Hollin Meadows Swim and Tennis Club at 2500 Woodlawn Trail is located near the "new" Hollin Hills area and was once part of CAHH. Today, the HMSTC is separate from the CAHH as a private-membership based club operating a 5-acre complex in a wooded area, bordering the historic district boundaries.

== Awards and recognition ==
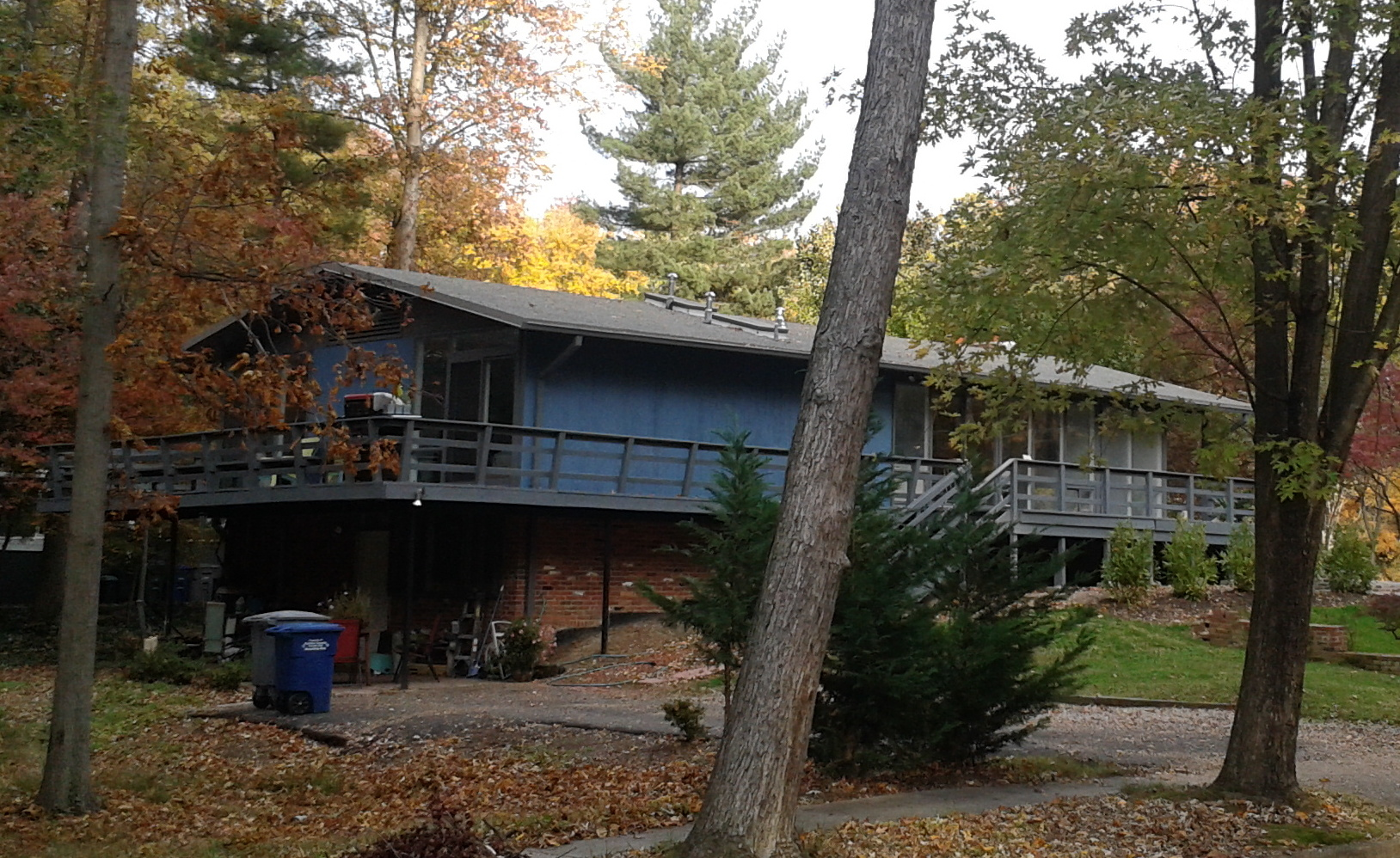
Example of House Unit Decca constructed in 1962 designed by developer Robert C. Davenport.

The structures and community of Hollin Hills has won many architectural and landscape design awards beginning with the Revere Quality House award from the Southwest Research Institute in 1950. After more than 25 years, the community was the inaugural awardee of the Test-of-Time Award (Residential category) from the Virginia Society of the American Institute of Architects (AIA) for its lasting appeal in site-planning, house sitting and architecture for houses on Stafford Road.

With its last home constructed in 1971, the community's first significant and lasting recognition as a historic community occurred quickly thereafter with its 1972 inclusion in the Fairfax County's Inventory of Historic Sites. Next in December 2004, Hollin Hills is prominently listed within The Contemporary House and The Contemporary Landscape Design sections of the National Register of Historic Places (NRHP) multiple property submission for Historic Residential Suburbs in the United States, 1830–1960. Subsequently, the Board of the Civic Association of Hollin Hills (CAHH) sought and was granted state and national designations when Hollin Hills was added to the Virginia Landmarks Register in late June 2013, followed by its September 2013 inclusion as a National Register of Historic Places national historic district.

Year	Title	Organization	Notes
1950–51	Certificate of Merit	Revere Home Program sponsored by the Southwest Research Institute Housing Research Foundation	Certified Quality House Program
1951	"Best Houses under $15,000”	Life magazine	Life (September 10, 1951 edition) awards Unit Type No. 2 homes: * 7221 Stafford Rd (Mr. and Mrs. Allan Searle) * 7223 Stafford Rd (Mr. and Mrs. Daniel Whitely) * 7301 Stafford Rd (Mr. and Mrs. James Anderson)
1951	Certificate of Merit	Southwest Research Institute	Hollin Hills named "Nation's Outstanding Development; Charles Goodman named "Architect of the Year"; Robert C. Davenport named "Builder of the Year"
1950–51	Best Homes for Family Living	Parents magazine	Award presented at the National Association of Home Builders (Jan 1952) and published in the Parents Feb 1952 edition * Unit Type No. 2 - 7309 Stafford Rd (Mr. and Mrs. Alex Radin) * Unit Type 2B42LB - 7313 Stafford Rd (Mr. and Mrs. Howard West)
1954	Award of Merit	American Institute of Architects (AIA) National Honor Award	Original Square house design, 7322 Rebecca Dr
1954	Most Advanced Builder House	House & Home, The Magazine of Building	Unit Type 5A
1955	Award of Merit	AIA Washington–Metropolitan Chapter	
1955	National Award	AIA	
1955	The Evening Star–AIA Award for Residential Architecture	AIA Washington–Metropolitan Chapter	Class 1 - Custom Designed Homes for Owner Occupancy * 7411 Recard Ln (then 6 Recard Ln) (Clarence O. Skinner Residence); Class 2 - Development Houses for Sale or Rent * 400 Paul Spring Rd (Casper Neer Residence)
1956	The Evening Star–AIA Award for Residential Architecture	AIA Washington–Metropolitan Chapter	Unit Type 5CS at 1241 Rebecca Dr (M. E. Odoroff Residence)
1957	The Evening Star–AIA Award for Residential Architecture	AIA Washington–Metropolitan Chapter	Development house category: 1216 Rebecca Dr (Joseph R. Lane Residence); Remodeled house category: 410 Paul Spring Rd (Mr. & Mrs. Martin M. Rosen Residence); architect for remodeling (Casper S. Neer); Remodeled house category: 1 Bedford Ln (Mr. & Mrs. William Welch Residence); architect for remodeling (Casper S. Neer)
1957	Merchant Built winners of Homes for Better Living Awards	AIA in cooperation with House and Home, Better Homes and Gardens, and NBC	* Award of Merit–7322 Rebecca Dr (Mr. and Mrs. Jeremy Hodson) * Honorable Mention–607 Sherwood Hall Ln
1957	Best Homes for Family Living - Special Merit Award for Distinctive Design	Parents magazine	407 Brentwood Pl (R. Randall Vosbeck Residence)
1957	AIA Regional Award Competition	AIA	* Award of Merit–1241 Rebecca Dr (M. E. Odoroff Residence) * Honorable Mention–607 Sherwood Hall Ln (Residence)
1957	AIA Centennial Exhibit—100 Years of American Architecture	AIA	Selected as one of ten "Milestones in future of American Architecture" exhibit at National Gallery of Art
1958	Exhibit of U.S. Architecture	International Union of Architects (French: Union internationale des Architectes; UIA)	5th UIA World Congress (held in Moscow, Russia)
1961	Better Living: A Sensible Buy in the Suburbs	Life magazine	Review by archtitect critic Paul Rudolph on pg. 114, 116
1976	Award of Excellence	The Washington Post	"Let the Sun Shine In"
1972	Fairfax County's Inventory of Historic Sites	Fairfax County, Virginia	
1981	Test-of-Time Award	AIA Virginia Society	Hollin Hills awarded the inaugural Test-of-Time Award (Residential Award); the Virginia Record journal showcased Unit Type No. 2B42LB homes: * 7311 Stafford Rd (Mr. and Mrs. Gilbert Beebee) * 7313 Stafford Rd (Mr. and Mrs. Howard West)
1989	Design Award for Continuing Contributions to Community Appearance	Northern Virginia Community Appearance Alliance	
1997	Award for Excellence (2)	AIA Virginia Society, and AIA Northern Virginia Chapter	for an addition to the Killpatrick residence, 2117 Paul Spring Rd, designed by architect Matt Poe
2004	Historic Residential Suburbs in the United States MPD, 1830–1960	National Register of Historic Places (NHRP); National Park Service	Listed at national level of multiple property designation.
2005	Honorable Mention	Fairfax County Exceptional Design Awards	
2010	‘Mad Men’ Look Contest 2010 - 3rd place	The Washington Post	K. Smith residence
2012	‘Mad Men’ Look Contest 2012 - Winner	The Washington Post	Unit Type 5CS at Kimbro St (D. Rivera and J. Hall-Rivera residence)
2013	Virginia Landmarks Register	Virginia Department of Historic Resources	029-5471 Hollin Hills Historic District
2013	National Register of Historic Places (NRHP) historic district	National Register of Historic Places (NHRP); National Park Service	326-acre suburban development under Criteria A and C with a period of significance from 1946 to 1971; 475 homes as contributing structures
2015	Hollin Hills Historic District, Ronald F. Lee residence (1949–60)	National Register of Historic Places (NHRP); National Park Service	Criteria B addendum for 1805 Drury Lane
2018	Historic American Buildings Survey (HABS)	Heritage Documentation Programs; National Park Service	Extensive drawings, photographs and written reports on: Unit House No. 7L Custom Line - 2402 Brentwood Pl; Unit House No. 5B - 2204 Glasgow Rd; Unit House No. 2BR2LB - 2224 Glasgow Rd
2022	Fairfax County Environmental Excellence Award	Fairfax County Office of Environmental and Energy Coordination	Elisabeth Lardner, CAHH Parks Committee (Individual County Resident Category)
2022	Historic Overlay District (HOD) designation	Fairfax County Board of Supervisors	

== Notable people ==
Over the decades, this mid-century modern community has attracted artists, architects, politicians, lawyers, doctors and numerous other individuals typical of the metropolitan DC region, including the production designers for Mad Men, Dan Bishop and Jeremy Conway. Notable residents include:

- Reginald Bartholomew—diplomat
- Gilbert Wheeler Beebe—epidemiologist and statistician
- James Carroll—author, historian, and journalist
- Joseph Carroll—military officer (Lt. General); original settler of Hollin Hills (1950–58)
- Bernard B. Fall—prominent war correspondent, historian, political scientist, and expert on Indochina during the 1950s and 1960s
- Roberta Flack—singer
- Noel Gayler—naval officer (Admiral), 6th director of the National Security Agency
- Philip Hirschkop—civil rights lawyer
- Paul Krizek—politician; House of Delegates–District 44.
- Ronald F. Lee—principal architect of the national historic preservation program
- James G. O'Hara—former U.S. Representative
- Pat Roberts—retired U.S. Senator
- Salvatore R. Martoche—political appointee and judge
- Gil Scott-Heron—jazz poet and musician
- David McCullough—author
- William "Bill" Green Miller—ambassador
- Richard M. Moose—executive and diplomat
- Carl C. Mose—sculptor
- Helen W. Nies–judge
- Steve Novosel—jazz bassist and educator
- Michael Sorkin—architectural and urban critic, designer, and educator
- Kathleen Mary Spagnolo—artist
